= Steamboats of California =

Historical summary of Californian steam vessels

Steamboats operated in California on San Francisco Bay and the Sacramento–San Joaquin River Delta, and Sacramento River as early as November 1847, when the Sitka built by William A. Leidesdorff briefly ran on San Francisco Bay and up the Sacramento River to New Helvetia. After the first discovery of gold in California the first shipping on the bays and up the rivers were by ocean going craft that were able to sail close to the wind and of a shallow enough draft to be able to sail up the river channels and sloughs, although they were often abandoned by their crews upon reaching their destination. Regular service up the rivers, was provided primarily by schooners and launches to Sacramento and Stockton, that would take a week or more to make the trip.

== First steamboats on the Sacramento River and Delta ==
According to the January 11, 1854, Sacramento Daily Union, the first steamboat in California, besides the Sitka, was the Pioneer brought out in pieces from Boston, and put together at the West Point, in Benicia, and launched there in August, 1849, by the "Edward Everett Company". She was a side-wheeler, 70 feet in length, 25 feet beam, with an eight horse power engine that made "4 knots an hour, against wind and tide" and would normally carry forty passengers in her cabin and on her decks. In September, she made one trip to Sacramento and back, then was sold to Simmons, Hutchinson & Company for service between Sacramento and the Yuba River. The first steamboat advertised in the Weekly Alta California, on October 18, 1849, providing transport between San Francisco and Sacramento, and touching at Benicia, was the Mint, a 36-foot iron-hulled vessel.

The first large steam driven vessel running between San Francisco and Sacramento was the steamship McKim, a 400-ton ex Army propeller driven transport steamship that had sailed to California from New Orleans. McKim made its first regular run up river on October 26, 1849, in 17 hours, touching at Benicia on the way to Sacramento. Its schedule became, to leave San Francisco on Mondays and Thursdays at 7 a.m.; returning, it left Sacramento on Wednesdays and Fridays at 7 a.m. $30 was charged for passage in cabins, $20 on deck, berths in staterooms $5, $1.50 meals for cabin passengers only. Heavy freight was $2.50/100 pounds or $1.00 per foot for measured goods. During its early trips on the route it made $16,000 each trip for the Simmons, Hutchinson & Company. The second and larger steamer up the Sacramento was the 755-ton side-wheel steamship SS Senator, a former Atlantic coastal steamer from Boston. It arrived from its voyage around Cape Horn, on October 7, 1849, and began running on the river November 8, and began bringing in $60,000 each month. Running on alternate days three days a week with the McKim, Simmons, Hutchinson & Co. provided daily service between the two cities.

In the early frenzy to reach California several steamboats made the voyage around Cape Horn under their own power but not without many dangers and difficulty. Among these were the Antelope, Goliah, General Warren, New World, Hartford, Seneca and Wilson G. Hunt. The New York and the Rhode Island, also attempted it but were both lost without a trace. The W. J Pease only got to Montevideo, where the condition of its hull and boilers caused it to be condemned. With these exceptions during the first years of the California Gold Rush its first steamboats were from eastern shipyards, knocked down and sent by ship to San Francisco Bay. There on the beach of Yerba Buena Cove and elsewhere, enterprising forty-niner shipbuilders reassembled them on the shore and sent them up the Sacramento River to Sacramento.

The first steamboats operating above Sacramento on the Sacramento River were the 52-ton Linda and the 36.5-ton Lawrence. Also steamboats operated on the American River, tributary to the Sacramento River, up to Norristown, smaller boats as far as Coloma. On the Feather River they steamed up to Yuba City, and on the Yuba River to Marysville, both also tributaries of the Sacramento. Others steamed farther up the Sacramento river as far north as Red Bluff and the 42-ton steamboat Jack Hays reached Redding the head of navigation on the Sacramento, during the spring flood on May 8, 1850. It then began regular service up river:

"The steamer JACK HAYS, having returned from a successful trip to the Upper Sacramento, will continue to run on this route until further notice. To miners bound to Trinity and to traders on the Upper Sacramento, this boat offers great facilities."

== Early San Joaquin River steamboats ==
In November 1849, the Captain Sutter built by Domingo Marcucci in his shipyard on Rincon Point on Yerba Buena Cove for the Aspinwall Steam Transportation Line was the first such steamboat up the San Joaquin River to reach Stockton. Marcucci next converted for the Sacramento run, the El Dorado, a 153-ton side-wheel steamboat that had been rigged as a 3 masted schooner to sail around Cape Horn. In April 1850, another of Marcucci's boats, the sidewheeler Georgiana pioneered the short cut route through the Delta between Sacramento and Stockton. It led through what afterward was known as Georgiana Slough, which connects the Sacramento River with the San Joaquin River through the Mokelumne River. In May 1850, the Georgiana pioneered the route from Stockton up the San Joaquin River and Tuolumne River to Tuolumne City. Subsequently, her captain, began a weekly service from Stockton to San Joaquin City, Grayson City and Tuolumne City timed to leave after the arrival of the Captain Sutter from San Francisco.

Later in the 1850s steamboats would reach up the San Joaquin River beyond Stockton as far south as Sycamore Point and to Fort Miller in the spring flood. San Joaquin steamboats could reach Watson's Ferry on Fresno Slough and could reach the lower Kern River and Tulare Lake in years when the lake overflowed down Fresno Slough to the San Joaquin River. Steamboats also operated on the Mokelumne River up to Lockford and the Tuolumne River, up to Empire City, both tributaries of the San Joaquin River.

== California steamboat building ==
Iron and timber suppliers to California shipyards appeared, supplied in part by the ship breaking yards scavenging the hundreds of hulks in Yerba Buena Cove, and in the river near Sacramento and Stockton. After machinery and boiler manufacturers appeared, steamboats and steam ferries began to be built entirely in California shipyards from 1856 onward, at Steamboat Point and later The Protrero, and Hunters Point around Mission Bay. Also at Benicia, Stockton, Oakland, Soquel, Vallejo, Washington and Yuba City. Many of these builders also built for the needs of other places on the west coast, including the coastal bays of California, the Colorado River, the Columbia River and its tributaries, the Puget Sound, and elsewhere in Oregon, Washington Territory, and the West Coast of Mexico, Central and South America. Often craftsmen traveled to build these craft locally. This continued until these places were able to build a shipbuilding industry of their own.
