= List of ship launches in 1849 =

The following ships were launched in 1849.

Date	Ship	Class / type	Builder	Location	Country	Notes
1 January	Ceres	Brigantine	R. Sparrow	Wexford	United Kingdom	For private owner.
10 January	Palestine	Schooner	Rice Jone	Dinas	United Kingdom	For private owners.
12 January	Elizabeth Rose	Brig	Messrs. Rose and Son	Leith	United Kingdom	For private owner.
24 January	Barrowgate	Brig	W. & J. Pile	Sunderland	United Kingdom	For Pegg & Co.
24 January	Maria	Snow	John Watson	Sunderland	United Kingdom	For Shaw & Co.
24 January	Paradise	Barque	William Wilkinson	Deptford	United Kingdom	For Miller & Co.
24 January	Vigilant	Schooner	R. H. Potts	Sunderland	United Kingdom	For Cumine & Co.
25 January	Emperor	Barque	Austin & Mills	Sunderland	United Kingdom	For Mr. Adamson.
25 January	Randolph	Full-rigged ship	James Laing	Sunderland	United Kingdom	For Duncan Dunbar.
25 January	Stag	Merchantman	Webster	Fraserburgh	United Kingdom	For Messrs. Simpson.
26 January	Why Not	Schooner	Richard Price	Caernarfon	United Kingdom	For private owner.
26 January	William and Caroline	Sloop	Thomas Williams	Caernarfon	United Kingdom	For private owner.
27 January	Princess	Brig	Messrs. Hall	Aberdeen	United Kingdom	For private owners.
27 January	Vulcan	Troopship	Ditchburn & Mare	Blackwall	United Kingdom	For Royal Navy.
29 January	Regalia	Steamship	Messrs. Joseph Birnie & Co	Montrose	United Kingdom	For private owner.
1 February	Atlantic	Paddle steamer		Hudson River	United States	For Collins Line.
1 February	Pacific	Paddle steamer	Brown & Bell	New York	United States	For Collins Line.
7 February	Belfast	Tug	Messrs. Coated & Young	Belfast	United Kingdom	For private owners.
8 February	Elfin	Despatch boat		Chatham Dockyard	United Kingdom	For Royal Navy.
8 February	Ganges	Steamship	Pitcher	Northfleet	United Kingdom	For Peninsular and Oriental Steam Navigation Company.
8 February	Lancastrian	Steamship	Thomas Royden	Liverpool	United Kingdom	For private owner.
9 February	The Wave	Schooner	Messrs. Humphrey & Co.	Hull	United Kingdom	For private owner.
14 February	Maize	Brig	Messrs. Young & Co.	North Shields	United Kingdom	For private owner.
22 February	Paragon	Brig	W. Read	Ipswich	United Kingdom	For Messrs. Haggar & Goddard.
23 February	Clara Jane	Merchantman	Buchanan & Gibson	Sunderland	United Kingdom	For Gates & Co.
February	Dundyvan	Schooner		Belfast	United Kingdom	For private owner.
5 March	Solon	Merchantman	William Byers	Sunderland	United Kingdom	For N. Smirke.
7 March	Magicienne	Magicienne-class paddle frigate	John Penn & Son	Pembroke Dockyard	United Kingdom	For Royal Navy.
8 March	Crocus	Brig	J. T. Alcock	Sunderland	United Kingdom	For T. Alcock.
9 March	Constellation	Full-rigged ship		New York	United States	For Kermit Line.
10 March	Bon Accord	Brig	Messrs. Hunter and Page	Dysart	United Kingdom	For Patrick Bannerman.
10 March	Margaret Ridley	Brig	Messrs. Cato, Miller & Co.	Liverpool	United Kingdom	For Messrs. Harrison, Ridley & Harrison.
12 March	Regina	Barque	J. & J. Robinson, or John Robinson	Sunderland	United Kingdom	For J. Denton.
17 March	John and Jane	Schooner	Messrs. Jones & Hughes	Flint	United Kingdom	For John Lloyd.
22 March	Susan and Mary	Schooner	M. Plummer	Newcastle upon Tyne	United Kingdom	For private owner.
24 March	Columbus	Medea-class steamboat	Messrs. Wigram	Blackwall	United Kingdom	For Spanish Government.
24 March	Jupiter	Paddle steamer	Messrs. Miller & Ravenhill	Blackwall	United Kingdom	For Star Company.
25 March	Tanger	Corvette		Brest	France	For French Navy.
26 March	Cicero	Snow	R. Wilkinson	Sunderland	United Kingdom	For Mr. Tully.
27 March	Archer	Archer-class Sloop		Deptford Dockyard	United Kingdom	For Royal Navy.
27 March	Enon	Barque	William Cunningham	Newcastle upon Tyne	United Kingdom	For private owner.
March	Buzzard	Buzzard-class sloop		Pembroke Dockyard	United Kingdom	For Royal Navy.
March	Egbert	Brig	Halls	Sunderland	United Kingdom	For private owner.
March	Guy Mannering	Merchantman		New York	United States	For private owner.
March	Sarah and Margaret	Brig	Carr	Hylton	United Kingdom	For private owner.
March	Spring	Snow	J. Crown	Southwick	United Kingdom	For Crown & Co.
March	Unition	Brig	Syke	Cox Green	United Kingdom	For Thomas Rickaby.
2 April	Sophina	Schooner	Quiggan & Co.	Douglas	Isle of Man	For Mr. Craine.
10 April	Esk	Steamship	Messrs. Menzies & Sons	Leith	United Kingdom	For private owner.
10 April	Star	Paddle steamer	Tod & McGregor	Glasgow	United Kingdom	For private owner.
21 April	Havering	Merchantman	Messrs. McLeod	South Shields	United Kingdom	For private owner.
24 April	Escape	Snow	Austin & Mills	Sunderland	United Kingdom	For Mr. Huntley.
25 April	Dreadnought	Schooner	A. Stevenson	Peterhead	United Kingdom	For private owners.
25 April	Joseph Brindley	Schooner	John Roberts	Pwllheli	United Kingdom	For private owner.
26 April	Ballengiech	East Indiaman	Messrs. Barclay & Curle	Glasgow	United Kingdom	For John Tod.
April	Hero	Schooner	Watson	Whitehills	United Kingdom	For Mr. Bartlett & others.
April	Theron	Barque	Austin & Mills	Sunderland	United Kingdom	For Mr. Lumsdon.
April	Volusia	Brig		River Tyne	United Kingdom	For private owner.
April	Whim	Brigantine		Saint John	(United Kingdom of Great Britain and Ireland) Colony of New Brunswick	For private owner.
5 May	Captain	Snow	Robert Thompson & Sons	Sunderland	United Kingdom	For Messrs. Graydons.
7 May	Greenock	Frigate	Scotts Shipbuilding and Engineering Co. Ltd.	Greenock	United Kingdom	For Royal Navy.
8 May	The Valentine	Schooner	Messrs. Nicholson & Simpson	Lancaster	United Kingdom	For private owner.
8 May	William & Mary	Snow	J. Rodgerson	Sunderland	United Kingdom	For J. Herring.
9 May	Apollo	Steamship	Messrs. Smith & Rodger	Greenock	United Kingdom	For private owner.
10 May	Benjamin Elkin	Merchantman	Messrs. Hall	Aberdeen	United Kingdom	For private owner.
10 May	Countess of Morley	Schooner	Routleff	Mount Batten	United Kingdom	For Charles Williams.
11 May	Victory	Steamship	Messrs. Denny Bros.	Dumbarton	United Kingdom	For North West of Ireland Steam Packet Company.
16 May	Dr. Ward	Merchantman		Blyth	United Kingdom	For private owner.
22 May	Megaera	Frigate	William Fairburn	Millwall	United Kingdom	For Royal Navy.
23 May	Desperate	Conflict-class sloop		Pembroke Dockyard	United Kingdom	For Royal Navy.
23 May	Tipzah	Snow	Bowman and Drummond	Blyth	United Kingdom	For John Davison.
24 May	Gem	Brig	Messrs. Lunnan & Robertson	Peterhead	United Kingdom	For W. Duthie.
24 May	Lady Fielding	Schooner	Messrs. Jones & Hughes	Flint	United Kingdom	For private owner.
24 May	Prince	Steamship	Messrs. Brownlow, Pearson & Co.	Hull	United Kingdom	For Hull Steam Packet Co.
24 May	Simoom	Troopship	Robert Napier and Sons	Govan	United Kingdom	For Royal Navy.
24 May	Thelam	East Indiaman	Joseph Steel Jr.	Liverpool	United Kingdom	For private owner.
25 May	A. F. Moore	Clipper	J. B. Bailey	Shoreham-by-Sea	United Kingdom	For private owner.
25 May	Emperor	Barque	Messrs. A. McMillan & Sons	Dumbarton	United Kingdom	For Alexander McKellar.
May	Jane Bird	Brig		Blyth, Northumberland	United Kingdom	For private owner.
May	Phantom	Brigantine		New Glasgow	(United Kingdom of Great Britain and Ireland) Colony of Nova Scotia	For private owner.
May	Tycho Wing	Merchantman		Wisbech	United Kingdom	For Mr. Young.
6 June	Electric Flash	Schooner	Read	Ipswich	United Kingdom	For private owner.
8 June	British Queen	Steamship	Messrs. Denny Bros.	Dumbarton	United Kingdom	For Messrs. Brownlow, Pearson & Co.
8 June	Emperor	Paddle steamer	Robert Napier and Sons	Govan	United Kingdom	For Messrs. Ghee & Co.
20 June	Anglia	Barque	James Laing	Hull	United Kingdom	For Prowse & Co.
20 June	Arethusa	Constance-class frigate		Pembroke Dockyard	United Kingdom	For Royal Navy.
20 June	Britannia	Brig	John Duncan	Kingston on Spey	United Kingdom	For private owner.
21 June	Lydia	Full-rigged ship	Austin & Mills	Sunderland	United Kingdom	For Messrs. John & Robert Sharp.
21 June	Ceres	Schooner	John Duncan	Kingston on Spey	United Kingdom	For private owner.
21 June	Nora	Schooner	Read	Ipswich	United Kingdom	For Mr. Cloid.
21 June	The Sylph	Steamship	Thomas Vernon	Liverpool	United Kingdom	For Mr. Crippin.
21 June	Vallismeria	Barque	Messrs. Duthie	Footdee	United Kingdom	For Mr. Nicol.
3 July	Sultana	Schooner	Ratcliffe & Spence	Sunderland	United Kingdom	For John Bowey.
5 July	Capricieuse	Corvette		Toulon	France	For French Navy.
5 July	Cora	Steamship	Messrs. Patterson & Co	Bristol	United Kingdom	For Austrian Navy.
5 July	Horatio	Snow	builder	Sunderland	United Kingdom	For Watson & Co.
7 July	Clipper	Steamship	Messrs. Caird & Co.	Greenock	United Kingdom	For Said Pacha.
7 July	Manchester	Ferry	Messrs. Robinson and Russell	Millwall	United Kingdom	For Manchester, Sheffield and Lincolnshire Railway.
19 July	Isly	Frigate		Toulon	France	For French Navy.
19 July	Neptune	Merchantman		Arbroath	United Kingdom	For Patrick Allan.
19 July	Ocean	Snow	George Barker	Sunderland	United Kingdom	For Mr. Bell.
21 July	Barrick	Barque	Messrs. H. & G. Barrick	Whitby	United Kingdom	For Messrs. Henry Barrick & Co.
21 July	Victor	Génie-class brig		Brest	France	For French Navy.
July	Britannia	Barque	R. H. Potts	Sunderland	United Kingdom	For Potts Bros.
July	Cadet	Barque		St. Mary's Bay	(United Kingdom of Great Britain and Ireland) Unknown	For private owner.
July	Indian Princess	Schooner			(United Kingdom of Great Britain and Ireland) Colony of Prince Edward Island	For private owner.
July	Sheffield	Ferry		River Humber	United Kingdom	For Manchester, Sheffield and Lincolnshire Railway.
1 August	Maid of Lorn	Steamship	Messrs. Wingat & Co.	Partick	United Kingdom	For Glasgow and Highland Steam Packet Company.
4 August	Bolivia	Paddle steamer	Robert Napier and Sons	Govan	United Kingdom	For Pacific Steam Navigation Company.
4 August	Inca	Steamship	Messrs. Patterso & Co.	Bristol	United Kingdom	For Austrian Navy.
6 August	Anenome	Merchantman	Buchanan & Gibson	Sunderland	United Kingdom	For Cropton & Co.
6 August	Aurora	Barque	Messrs. Haswell & Bulmer	Hylton Ferry	United Kingdom	For Thomas Stainton.
6 August	Effort	Merchantman	Booth & Blacklock	Sunderland	United Kingdom	For Mr. Robinson.
6 August	Robert and Mary	Merchantman	J. & J. Robinson, or John Robinson	Sunderland	United Kingdom	For R. Surtees.
12 August	Pioneer	Paddle steamer	Edward Everett Company	Benicia, California	United States	For Edward Everett Company.
17 August	Asia	East Indiaman	Messrs. Barr & Shearer	Ardrossan	United Kingdom	For J. J. Gibb.
18 August	Vernon	Ferry	T. Vernon	Liverpool	United Kingdom	For Liverpool Corporation.
20 August	Eliza Hart	Barque	J. Watson	Sunderland	United Kingdom	For Hart & Co.
20 August	Moultan	Full-rigged ship	Messrs. Denny & Rankine	Dumbarton	United Kingdom	For William Crawford & others.
August	Hastings	Barque	Austin & Mills	Sunderland	United Kingdom	For J. C. Munro.
August	Octavia	Constance-class frigate		Pembroke Dockyard	United Kingdom	For Royal Navy.
1 September	Emperor	Barque	Messrs. A. Hall & Sons	Aberdeen	United Kingdom	For private owner.
3 September	Dale	Barque		Howdon	United Kingdom	For T. Dale.
3 September	Thomas Forrest	Barque	Thomas Forsyth	South Shields	United Kingdom	For private owner.
4 September	Mary Montague	West Indiaman	William Bayley	Ipswich	United Kingdom	For James Shepherd, Mr. Montague & others.
5 September	Active	Survey ship	J. A. Westervelt	New York	United States	For United States Coast and Geodetic Survey.
18 September	Dart	Schooner	Messrs. Menzies	Leith	United Kingdom	For London and Edinburgh Shipping Company.
18 September	Niobe	Diamond-class frigate		Devonport Dockyard	United Kingdom	For Royal Navy, but never commissioned.
19 September	Diana	Steamship	Messrs. Smith & Rodger	Govan	United Kingdom	For Saint Petersburg Steam Ship Co.
20 September	Mersey	Sloop	Emanuel Evans	Gadlys	United Kingdom	For G. G. Lewis.
25 September	Albert Gallatin	Packet ship		Hudson River	United States	For private owner.
3 October	Rapid	Schooner	Messrs. Lunnan & Robertson	Peterhead	United Kingdom	For Peterhead and London Shipping Co.
4 October	Alice Gill	Barque	Hobkirk	Whitby	United Kingdom	For Messr. Thistle & Co.
6 October	Vivid	Brig	Messrs. Connell	Belfast	United Kingdom	For Messrs. Sinclair & Boyd.
16 October	Centaur	Brig	Messrs. Blaikie Brothers	Footdee	United Kingdom	For private owner.
18 October	Gloriosa	Full-rigged ship	W. Wilkinson	Deptford	United Kingdom	For James Miller.
18 October	Savannah	Schooner	Bowman and Drummond	Blyth	United Kingdom	For John Bell & Sons.
19 October	Leonora Deva	Schooner	Tucker	Bristol	United Kingdom	For Messrs. Sims, Nevill & Co.
19 October	Seringapatam	East Indiaman	Messrs. John Scott & Sons	Greenock	United Kingdom	For Messrs. John Scott & Sons.
20 October	Cacique	Steamship	Messrs. Patterson & Son	Bristol	United Kingdom	For Austrian Navy.
20 October	Elizabeth	Snow	Austin & Mills	Sunderland	United Kingdom	For W. Turner.
23 October	Chesma	Khrabryi-class ship of the line	I. S. Dimitriev	Nicholaieff	Russia	For Imperial Russian Navy.
30 October	George Brown	Schooner	David Swan	Glasgow	United Kingdom	For private owner.
30 October	Rhine	Steamship	Messrs. Mare	Blackwall	United Kingdom	For General Steam Navigation Company.
October	Express	Brigantine		Port Wallace	(United Kingdom of Great Britain and Ireland) Colony of Nova Scotia	For private owner.
2 November	Camerton	Steamship	Messrs. Napier & Crichton	Kelvinhaugh	United Kingdom	For private owner.
8 November	Thetis	Cutter	Messrs. Hoad Bros.	Rye	United Kingdom	For Robert Huntley.
10 November	Dahomay	Barque	Messrs. Symons and Bevan	Wapping	United Kingdom	For Messrs. R. P. & W. King.
19 November	Propontis	Steamship	Messrs. Mare & Co.	Blackwall	United Kingdom	For Ottoman Government, or General Screw Shipping Company.
November	Trio	Merchantman	Hylton Carr	Sunderland	United Kingdom	For Bell & Co.
1 December	Onward	Fishing smack	J. Upham	Brixham	United Kingdom	For R. Hellyer.
1 December	Tiger	Steam sloop	J. Edye	Chatham Dockyard	United Kingdom	For Royal Navy.
16 December	Argus	Argus-class sloop	John Fincham	Portsmouth Dockyard	United Kingdom	For Royal Navy.
17 December	William Rathbone	Packet ship		Mystic, Connecticut	United States	For private owner.
31 December	Independence	Steamship	Thomas Toward	Newcastle upon Tyne	United Kingdom	For private owner.
December	Lochiel	Brig			(United Kingdom of Great Britain and Ireland) Colony of Prince Edward Island	For private owner.
Spring	Tinto	Full-rigged ship	W. G. Russell	Quebec	(United Kingdom of Great Britain and Ireland) Province of Canada	For private owner.
Autumn	John Bryant	Full-rigged ship			United Kingdom	For private owner.
Unknown date	Abyssinia	Barque	W. Petrie	Sunderland	United Kingdom	For Murray & Co.
Unknown date	Agamemnon	Full-rigged ship		River Wear	United Kingdom	For Messrs. Jefferson.
Unknown date	Agnes	Brigantine		Point Brenley	(United Kingdom of Great Britain and Ireland) Colony of Nova Scotia	For private owner.
Unknown date	Ain	Snow	Booth & Blacklock	Sunderland	United Kingdom	For Carr & Co.
Unknown date	Alice	Schooner	W. & J. Pile	Sunderland	United Kingdom	For J. Woods.
Unknown date	Annandale	Barque		Miramichi	(United Kingdom of Great Britain and Ireland) Colony of New Brunswick	For private owner.
Unknown date	Ann Rennison	Merchantman	Richard Ashburner	Greenodd	United Kingdom	For Richard Ashburner.
Unknown date	Argonaut	Clipper	Samuel Lapham	Medford, Massachusetts	United States	For John Ellerton Lodge.
Unknown date	Atalante	Sixth rate		Vlissingen	Netherlands	For Royal Netherlands Navy.
Unknown date	Balder	Man of war			Sweden	For Royal Swedish Navy.
Unknown date	Branch	Merchantman	Robert Thompson & Sons	Sunderland	United Kingdom	For Mr. Adamson.
Unknown date	Bywater	Snow	Hodgson & Gardner	Sunderland	United Kingdom	For Mr. Greenwell.
Unknown date	Canada	Barque	Forrest & Co	Sunderland	United Kingdom	For J. Hay.
Unknown date	Caspian	Merchantman	Lister & Bartram	Sunderland	United Kingdom	For Mr. Lumsden, or Edward Lumsden & Sons.
Unknown date	Centaur	Brig		Aberdeen	United Kingdom	For David and Thomas Blaikie.
Unknown date	Ceylon	Merchantman	William Doxford & W. Crown	Sunderland	United Kingdom	For private owner.
Unknown date	Change	Barque		Sunderland	United Kingdom	For Mr. Collinson.
Unknown date	Choice	Snow	Robert Thompson & Sons	Sunderland	United Kingdom	For Mr. Dauson.
Unknown date	Clorinda	Snow	Hardie & Clarke	Sunderland	United Kingdom	For Allen & Co.
Unknown date	Cockerills	Barque	William Robinson	Sunderland	United Kingdom	For Anthony Cockerill.
Unknown date	Ferrolana	Corvette			Spain	For Spanish Navy.
Unknown date	Cornelia	Barque	W. Naisby	Sunderland	United Kingdom	For John Dryden.
Date unknown	Corwin	Gunboat		Philadelphia, Pennsylvania	United States	For United States Coast Survey.
Unknown date	Crichton	Snow	William R. Abbay	Sunderland	United Kingdom	For Abbay & Co.
Unknown date	Cromwell	Snow	Robert Thompson & Sons	Sunderland	United Kingdom	For John Cockerill & Burton Brown.
Unknown date	Earl of Charlemont	Full-rigged passenger ship		Saint John	(United Kingdom of Great Britain and Ireland) Colony of New Brunswick	For Magee & Co.
Unknown date	Earl of Auckland	Steamship			United Kingdom	For General Screw Steam Shipping Company.
Unknown date	El Dorado	Paddle steamer	Thomas Colver		United States	Sold on stocks to Howland & Aspinwall.
Unknown date	Fatima	Barque	R. Hutchinson	Sunderland	United Kingdom	For private owner.
Unknown date	Favourite	Merchantman	R. & W. Hutchinson	Sunderland	United Kingdom	For T. Coxon.
Unknown date	Friendship	Sloop	J. Barkes	Sunderland	United Kingdom	For private owner.
Unknown date	Gipsy Queen	Merchantman	W. Petrie	Sunderland	United Kingdom	For Kirk & Co.
Unknown date	Goliah	Paddle tug	William H. Webb	New York	United States	For private owner.
Unknown date	Greta	Snow	Tiffin	Sunderland	United Kingdom	For private owner.
Unknown date	Groves	Snow	W. Briggs	Sunderland	United Kingdom	For private owner.
Unknown date	Harold	Barque	T. & J. Brocklebank	Whitehaven	United Kingdom	For Thomas Brocklebank.
Unknown date	Iceni	Merchantman	Peter Austin	Sunderland	United Kingdom	For Mr. Stevens.
Unknown date	Industry	Schooner		Miramichi	(United Kingdom of Great Britain and Ireland) Colony of New Brunswick	For private owner.
Unknown date	John Phillips	Barque		Hylton	United Kingdom	For J. Phillips.
Unknown date	John Twizell	Merchantman	Hodgson & Gardener	Sunderland	United Kingdom	For Mr. Twizell.
Unknown date	Joseph Shepherd	Barque	J. Crown	Sunderland	United Kingdom	For Mr. Shepherd.
Unknown date	Justyn	Barque		Quebec	(United Kingdom of Great Britain and Ireland) Province of Canada	For private owner.
Unknown date	Kate Kearney	Barque	George Worthy	Sunderland	United Kingdom	For Mr. Jenkins.
Unknown date	Komar	Zmeia-class schooner	Arsenal de la Carraca	Cádiz	Spain	For Imperial Russian Navy.
Unknown date	Lantao	Clipper	Samuel Hall	East Boston, Massachusetts	United States	For D. N. Spooner.
Unknown date	Lizzie Throop	Schooner	J. O'Connor	Mill Point, Michigan	United States	For Nathan Throop.
Unknown date	Maria and Elizabeth	Snow	Pearson	Sunderland	United Kingdom	For Muir & Co.
Unknown date	Marigalante	Lugger			Spain	For Spanish Navy.
Unknown date	Marthas	Merchantman	Robert Thompson & Sons	Sunderland	United Kingdom	For Thompson & Co.
Unknown date	Mary & Ellen	Snow	Todd & Brown	Sunderland	United Kingdom	For E. Oliver.
Unknown date	Mary Taylor	Pilot boat	Hathorne & Steers	Williamsburg, New York	United States	For Richard Brown.
Unknown date	Matrona	Merchantman	J. Candlish	Sunderland	United Kingdom	For L. Wilson.
Unknown date	Maxwell	Snow	W. Naisby	Sunderland	United Kingdom	For Mr. Dryden.
Unknown date	Minerva	Schooner	T. Dryden	Sunderland	United Kingdom	For Mr. Hickson.
Unknown date	Missionary	Barque	J. Watson	Sunderland	United Kingdom	For Gourley & Co.
Unknown date	Morrisons	Merchantman	W. Wilkinson	Deptford	United Kingdom	For Mr. Morrison.
Unknown date	Mukha	Zmeia-class schooner	Arsenal de la Carrac	Cádiz	Spain	For Imperial Russian Navy.
Unknown date	Mystery	Barque	W. Pily	Sunderland	United Kingdom	For Mr. Davisons.
Unknown date	New World	Paddle steamer	T. F. Secor	New York	United States	For private owner.
Unknown date	Nile	Full-rigged ship	Arnold Leithead	Sunderland	United Kingdom	For Duncan Dunbar.
Unknown date	Nizam	Merchantman	William Byers	Sunderland	United Kingdom	For Blair & Co.
Unknown date	Ocean Queen	Snow	Austin & Mills	Sunderland	United Kingdom	For Haley & Co.
Unknown date	Ocean Wave	Merchantman	Forrest & Co	Sunderland	United Kingdom	For private owner.
Unknown date	Oriental	Clipper	Jacob Bell	New York	United States	For A. A. Low & brother.
Unknown date	Ornen	Corvette			Norway	For Royal Norwegian Navy.
Unknown date	Palm	Barque		Sunderland	United Kingdom	For Mr. Garroway.
Unknown date	Pandora	Steam yacht	Messrs. Robinson and Russell	Millwall	United Kingdom	For Nawab Nizam of Moorsheadabad.
Unknown date	Pelayo	Brig			Spain	For Spanish Navy.
Unknown date	Pelham	Barque	T. Stonehouse	Sunderland	United Kingdom	For private owner.
Unknown date	Penelope	Barque	John Watson	Sunderland	United Kingdom	For Ellis & Co.
Unknown date	Phoenix	Merchantman	W. H. Pearson	Sunderland	United Kingdom	For W. H. Pearson.
Unknown date	Phoenix	Barque		Sunderland	United Kingdom	For Mr. Shellshear.
Unknown date	Princess	Barque	Todd & Brown	Sunderland	United Kingdom	For Mr. Wheatley.
Unknown date	Propontis	Steamship			United Kingdom	For General Screw Steam Shipping Company.
Unknown date	Raleigh	Merchantman	William Doxford & W. Crown	Sunderland	United Kingdom	For S. Alcock.
Unknown date	Rebecca	Snow	Lightfoot	Sunderland	United Kingdom	For Mr. Baldwin.
Unknown date	Reindeer	Clipper	Donald McKay	East Boston, Massachusetts	United States	For George B. Upton, John M. Forbes and Samson & Tappan.
Unknown date	Royal Rose	Merchantman	W. & J. Pile	Sunderland	United Kingdom	For Mr. Allen.
Unknown date	Saint Michael	Barque	W. H. Pearson	Sunderland	United Kingdom	For J. Dart.
Unknown date	San Giovanni	Corvette	Cantiere della Foce	Genoa	Kingdom of Sardinia	For Royal Sardinian Navy.
Unknown date	Sarah	Schooner	Joshua Helmsley	Sunderland	United Kingdom	For Mr. Smith.
Unknown date	Scipio	Brig			Spain	For Spanish Navy.
Unknown date	Sea Flower	Schooner	R. H. Potts	Sunderland	United Kingdom	For Potts & Co.
Unknown date	Seine	Steamship			United Kingdom	For General Steam Navigation Company.
Unknown date	Sir Charles Napier	Barque	Lister & Bartram	Sunderland	United Kingdom	For Mr. Nicholson.
Unknown date	Sisters	Schooner	William Pile	Sunderland	United Kingdom	For Benson & Co.
Unknown date	Stephen & Elizabeth	Merchantman	Robert Thompson & Sons	Sunderland	United Kingdom	For Mr. Farndell.
Unknown date	Sultana	Barque	William Reid	Cox Green	United Kingdom	For William Mitcheson.
Unknown date	Swift	Barque	R. & W. Hutchinson	Sunderland	United Kingdom	For private owner.
Unknown date	Tam o'Shanter	Clipper	Enou Soule	Freeport, Maine	United States	For Enos Soule.
Unknown date	Tanred	Brig	William R. Abbay	Sunderland	United Kingdom	For W. Abbay.
Unknown date	Ternate	Full-rigged ship			Netherlands	For Royal Netherlands Navy.
Unknown date	Thankful	Snow	Lister & Bartram	Sunderland	United Kingdom	For Lister & Co.
Unknown date	Thomasine	Merchantman	William Byers	Sunderland	United Kingdom	For Parker & Co.
Unknown date	Tiberias	Merchantman	W. Spowers & Co	Sunderland	United Kingdom	For Tomlin & Sons.
Unknown date	Ticonderoga	Clipper		Williamsburg, New York	United States	For private owner.
Unknown date	Vassati Tidgarets	Paddle steamer		Cowes	United Kingdom	For Ottoman Navy.
Unknown date	Von der Tann	Gunboat	Hilbert Shipyard	Kiel	Duchy of Holstein	For Schleswig-Holstein Navy.
Unknown date	West Dock	Steamship		Hartlepool	United Kingdom	For private owner.
Unknown date	William Richardson	Snow		Sunderland	United Kingdom	For Mr. Richardson.
Unknown date	William Simpson	Barque	Sykes, Talbot & Sykes	Sunderland	United Kingdom	For Thornton & Wests.
Unknown date	William Skee	Merchantman	Stothard	Sunderland	United Kingdom	For private owner.
Unknown date	Yankee	Paddle tug		Cincinnati, Ohio	United States	For private owner.
Unknown date	Zuleika	Barque	Peter Austin	Sunderland	United Kingdom	For Walker & Co.
