= List of shipwrecks in October 1873 =

The list of shipwrecks in October 1873 includes ships sunk, foundered, grounded, or otherwise lost during October 1873.

== 1 October ==
List of shipwrecks: 1 October 1873
Ship	State	Description
Elizabeth	United Kingdom	The ship was driven ashore at Shoreham-by-Sea, Sussex. She was on a voyage from Hamburg, Germany to Liverpool, Lancashire. She was refloated the next day.
Elizabeth Ann	United Kingdom	The schooner was driven ashore and wrecked near Lamorna, Cornwall. Her crew were rescued. She was on a voyage from Penzance, Cornwall to Cardiff, Glamorgan.
Ignacio S.	Austria-Hungary	The brig was wrecked 40 nautical miles (74 km) from the entrance to the Bosphorus.
Laughing Water	United Kingdom	The ship ran aground in the River Avon at Sea Mills, Somerset. She was on a voyage from Africa to Bristol, Gloucestershire. She was refloated. Whilst she was being taken in to Bristol, she was run into by the steamship Sabrina (United Kingdom) and was severely damaged.
Linnet	United Kingdom	The schooner was driven ashore south of Kronstadt, Russia. She was on a voyage from Königsberg, Germany to Kronstadt. She was refloated and taken in to Kronstadt.
Maisi	Spain	The steamship was wrecked in the Bahamas with the loss of 24 lives.
Missouri	United Kingdom	The steamship was wrecked on the Gingerbread Grounds, in the Bahamas. All on board, about 175 people, were rescued. She was on a voyage from Liverpool, Lancashire to New Orleans, Louisiana.
Wentworth Beaumont	United Kingdom	The brig was wrecked near Carrigaholt, County Clare with the loss of a crew member. She was on a voyage from London to Halifax, Nova Scotia, Canada, or from Limerick to South Shields, County Durham.
Unnamed	Flag unknown	A schooner and a steamship collided off Hittarp, Sweden. At least one vessel foundered.

== 2 October ==
List of shipwrecks: 2 October 1873
Ship	State	Description
Emerald Isle, and Jose	United Kingdom; Spain	The steamships collided in the Crosby Channel. Emerald Isle was on a voyage from Liverpool to Drogheda, County Louth. She was beached at Waterloo, Lancashire. All on board were taken off by the tug Mersey King (United Kingdom). Emerald Isle was refloated on 4 October and taken in to Liverpool, Lancashire. Jose was on a voyage from Havana, Cuba to Liverpool. She was taken in to Liverpool sinking at the bows.
Ismailia	United Kingdom	The steamship was sighted in the Atlantic Ocean during a voyage from New York, United States to Glasgow, Renfrewshire. No further trace, presumed foundered with the loss of all 52 people on board.
Laughing Water	United Kingdom	The ship ran aground in the River Avon at Sea Mills, Somerset. She was on a voyage from Africa to Bristol, Gloucestershire. She was subsequently run into by the steamship Sabrina (United Kingdom) and was severely damaged. Laughing Water was refloated.
Sjvelland	Denmark	The ship departed from Mobile, Alabama, United States for Havre de Grâce, Seine-Inférieure, France. No further trace, presumed foundered with the loss of all hands.
Thomas Mitchell	United Kingdom	The ship was wrecked at "Tolbuchin". Her crew were rescued. She was on a voyage from Liverpool to Helsingør, Denmark.
Triton	Norway	The ship was wrecked near Lemvig. Her crew were rescued. She was on a voyage from Seville, Spain to Saint Petersburg, Russia.
Whittington	United Kingdom	The steamship ran aground on the Cross Sand, in the North Sea off the coast of Norfolk and was abandoned by her crew. She was on a voyage from Amble, Northumberland to Ghent, East Flanders, Belgium. She subsequently sank.
Unnamed	United Kingdom	The steamship ran aground whilst going to the assistance of Emerald Isle (United Kingdom).

== 3 October ==
List of shipwrecks: 3 October 1873
Ship	State	Description
Mariner	United Kingdom	The schooner departed from Liverpool, Lancashire for Wicklow. No further trace, presumed foundered with the loss of all hands.

== 4 October ==
List of shipwrecks: 4 October 1873
Ship	State	Description
Antonio	Flag unknown	The ship ran aground. She was on a voyage from South Shields, County Durham, United Kingdom to Galle, Ceylon. She was refloated and put back to South Shields in a leaky condition.
Gazelle	United Kingdom	The ketch collided with the steamship Widdrington (United Kingdom) and sank off the Kentish Knock. Her crew were rescued by Widdrington.
Peacemaker	United Kingdom	The ship ran aground on the Pluckington Bank, in Liverpool Bay. She was on a voyage from Bombay, India to Liverpool, Lancashire. She was refloated.
Rau Runnels	Flag unknown	The barque was lost off San Juan del Sur, Nicaragua.

== 5 October ==
List of shipwrecks: 5 October 1873
Ship	State	Description
Hebburn Hall	United Kingdom	The steamship ran aground on the Baldayo Stacks, off the north coast of Spain and sank. Her crew were rescued. She was on a voyage from Cardiff, Glamorgan, to Messina, Sicily, Italy.

== 6 October ==
List of shipwrecks: 6 October 1873
Ship	State	Description
Ailsa	United Kingdom	The steamship ran aground on the Nash Sands, in the Bristol Channel off the coast of Glamorgan. She was refloated and resumed her voyage.
Jane and Mary	United Kingdom	The sloop was driven ashore and wrecked in the Water of Urr. Her crew were rescued. She was on a voyage from Maryport, Cumberland to Palanckie, Kirkcudbrightshire.
Pleiades	United Kingdom	The ship collided with Happy-go-Lucky off Black Head, Wigtownshire and was beached. She was on a voyage from Maryport, Cumberland to Belfast, County Antrim. She was refloated and taken in to a port.

== 7 October ==
List of shipwrecks: 7 October 1873
Ship	State	Description
Enrique	Spain	The brig collided with the steamship Buena Ventura (Spain) and sank off Cádiz. Her crew were rescued by the steamship Fatchoy (Spain)
Grenada	United Kingdom	The barque was destroyed by fire at New York, United States.
Lavinia	(United Kingdom of Great Britain and Ireland) Guernsey	The ship ran aground on the Hook Sands, in the English Channel off the coast of Dorset. She was refloated with assistance and resumed her voyage.
Lisitche	Spain	The barque foundered at sea during a hurricane.
Marlborough	Canada	The ship was driven ashore on Tybee Island, Georgia, United States. She was refloated on 9 October with the assistance of a tug.
Perseverance	United Kingdom	The ship collided with the steamship Olinda (United Kingdom) and sank off the Isles of Scilly. Her crew were rescued. Perseverance was on a voyage from Larache, Morocco to Falmouth, Cornwall.
Polly	United Kingdom	The schooner ran aground at Hellevoetsluis, Zeeland, Netherlands. She was on a voyage from Teignmouth, Devon to Dordrecht, South Holland, Netherlands. She was refloated.
Prinz Carl	Sweden	The ship ran aground on the Burnham Flats, off the coast of Norfolk, United Kingdom. She was refloated and assisted in to Grimsby, Lincolnshire, United Kingdom.
Unnamed	United Kingdom	The schooner ran aground on the Little Burbo Bank, in Liverpool Bay.

== 8 October ==
List of shipwrecks: 8 October 1873
Ship	State	Description
Barbara Young	United Kingdom	The schooner sprang a leak and was beached near Broughty Ferry, Forfarshire in a waterlogged condition. She was on a voyage from Perth to Newcastle upon Tyne, Northumberland.
Carioca	United Kingdom	The ship was sighted off Bic, Quebec, Canada whilst on a voyage from Quebec City to Wexford. No further trace, presumed foundered with the loss of all hands.
Fleece	United Kingdom	The brigantine was driven ashore and wrecked in Ross Bay.
Glamorgan	United Kingdom	The schooner was driven ashore and wrecked on Holy Island, Anglesey. Her crew were rescued.
Unnamed	United Kingdom	The lugger was run down and sunk in the North Sea by the steamship Osborne (United Kingdom) with the loss of all but one of her crew. The survivor was rescued by Osborne.

== 9 October ==
List of shipwrecks: 9 October 1873
Ship	State	Description
Beulah	United Kingdom	The steamship struck a rock and foundered off Cape de Gatt, Spain. Her crew rescued by the schooner Henry Scholefield (United Kingdom). Beulah was on a voyage from Newcastle upon Tyne, Northumberland to Savona, Italy.
Mary	United Kingdom	The schooner was driven ashore and wrecked at Porthkerry, Glamorgan. All on board were rescued by rocket apparatus. She was on a voyage from Newport, Monmouthshire to Cork.
Raccoon	United Kingdom	The ship was wrecked on "Harstmul Island", in Loch Boisdale. Her crew survived. She was on a voyage from Bangor, Caernarfonshire to Aberdeen.
Singapore	United Kingdom	The ship ran aground on the Kish Bank, in the Irish Sea. She was on a voyage from Liverpool, Lancashire to Valparaíso, Chile. She was refloated and put back to Liverpool.
Western Metropolis	United States	The steamship caught fire at New Orleans, Louisiana.
William Radcliffe	United Kingdom	The schooner was driven ashore at Boneybefore, County Antrim. She was on a voyage from Ayr to Belfast, County Antrim.

== 10 October ==
List of shipwrecks: 10 October 1873
Ship	State	Description
Emma	United Kingdom	The brig arrived at Saint-Malo, Ille-et-Vilaine on fire. She was on a voyage from Newcastle upon Tyne, Northumberland to Saint-Malo.
George Batta	United Kingdom	The barque was destroyed by fire 8 nautical miles (15 km) north of "Nagara". Her crew were rescued. She was on a voyage from Hull Yorkshire to Odesa, Russia.
Hermes	United Kingdom	The ship was driven ashore at Portrush, County Antrim. She was refloated the next day and found to be severely leaky.
Hirundo	Norway	The barque was abandoned in the Atlantic Ocean. Her crew were rescued by Fear Not (United States). Hirundo was on a voyage from New York, United States to Falmouth, Cornwall, United Kingdom.
Jean Henri	France	The schooner foundered in the North Sea off Flamborough Head, Yorkshire. Her crew were rescued by Young Alice (United Kingdom).
Louisa	Denmark	The barque ran aground on the Goodwin Sands, Kent, United Kingdom. Her ten crew were rescued by the North Deal and Walmer Lifeboats, and the tug Aid (United Kingdom). Louisa was on a voyage from Gävle, Sweden to Livorno, Italy. She was refloated and found to be leaky.
Sensation	United Kingdom	The ship ran aground on the Shoebury Sand, in the Thames Estuary off the coast of Essex. She was refloated with assistance.
Triton	Sweden	The ship was driven ashore on the east coast of Öland. She was on a voyage from Härnösand to Dieppe, Seine-Inférieure, France. She was refloated and assisted in to Kalmar in a leaky condition.
Tulip	United Kingdom	The schooner was wrecked on Saunton Sands, Devon.
Unnamed	United Kingdom	The Mersey Flat was run down and sunk in the River Mersey by the steamship Ida Batters (United Kingdom).

== 11 October ==
List of shipwrecks: 11 October 1873
Ship	State	Description
Henry	United Kingdom	The lighter sank at Queenstown, County Cork.
Ringleader	United Kingdom	The schooner ran aground on the South West Spit. She was refloated and taken in to Boston, Massachusetts, United States.
Sensation	United Kingdom	The brigantine ran aground on the Shoebury Sands, in the Thames Estuary. She was on a voyage from Maceió, Brazil to London. She was refloated and taken in to Gravesend, Kent.
Signe	Sweden	The barque ran aground at Vlissingen, Zeeland, Netherlands. She was on a voyage from Skellefteå to Antwerp, Belgium. She was refloated and towed in to Antwerp in a waterlogged condition.

== 12 October ==
List of shipwrecks: 12 October 1873
Ship	State	Description
Albicore	United Kingdom	The steamship collided with the steamship Fijenoord (Netherlands) at Hellevoetsluis, Zeeland, Netherlands and was severely damaged. She was on a voyage from Rotterdam, South Holland, Netherlands to Grangemouth, Stirlingshire. She put in to Hellevoetsluis.
Jane	United Kingdom	The schooner was run down in the North Sea 18 nautical miles (33 km) off the mouth of the Humber by the barque Magdalena (Italy). Jane was on a voyage from Hartlepool, County Durham to Ipswich, Suffolk. She was assisted in to Grimsby, Lincolnshire by a smack.
Margaretha	Germany	The galiot foundered in the North Sea. Her crew were rescued by Salina (Germany).
Porteña	Argentina	The steamship, which had been captured by revolutionaries in an attempted coup, was run ashore on Santa Catarina Island, Brazil to prevent capture by ships to the Argentinian and Uruguayan Navies.
Stirling	United Kingdom	The steamship sprang a leak at Kronstadt, Russia and was beached. She was on a voyage from Leith, Lothian to Kronstadt.

== 13 October ==
List of shipwrecks: 13 October 1873
Ship	State	Description
Belleisle	United Kingdom	The ship ran aground in Liverpool Bay off the Formby Lightship ( Trinity House). She was on a voyage from Charleston, South Carolina to Liverpool, Lancashire. She was refloated and taken in to Liverpool.
Eliza Walker	United Kingdom	The ship departed from Larache, Morocco for a British port. No further trace, presumed foundered with the loss of all hands.
George Washington	Norway	The ship was wrecked off Holmögadd, Sweden. Her crew were rescued.
Hawk	United Kingdom	The steamship ran aground in the Nieuw Diep, or at Hellevoetsluis, Zeeland, Netherlands. She was refloated.
John Wesley	United Kingdom	The ship struck a rock and foundered off The Manacles, Cornwall. Her crew were rescued by Irish Lily (United Kingdom). John Wesley was on a voyage from Truro, Cornwall to Newport, Monmouthshire.
Mary Maria	United Kingdom	The steamship was wrecked off Brielle, South Holland, Netherlands. Her crew survived. She was on a voyage from Middlesbrough, Yorkshire to Rotterdam, South Holland.
Méndez Núñez	Cantonalist Rebels	Cantonal rebellion: The ironclad ran aground at Cartagena, Canton of Cartagena. She was refloated.
Narcissus	United Kingdom	The brig was wrecked off Amrum, Germany. Her crew were rescued. She was on a voyage from Hartlepool, County Durham to Itzehoe, Germany.
Oleander	United Kingdom	The barque ran aground on Sandy Point, Monmouthshire and broke her back. She was on a voyage from Newport, Monmouthshire to Montevideo, Uruguay. She was refloated in late October but was consequently condemned.
Stoomvaart	Netherlands	The steamship ran aground off Vlieland, Friesland. She was refloated.
Suvo	(Russian Empire) Grand Duchy of Finland	The barque ran aground on the Hittarp Reef, in the Baltic Sea. She was on a voyage from London, United Kingdom to a Baltic port. She was refloated with the assistance of two tugs and taken in to Helsingør.
Thetis	United Kingdom	The steamship was driven ashore 2 nautical miles (3.7 km) from Ardrossan, Ayrshire. She was on a voyage from Greenock, Renfrewshire to Ardrossan. She was refloated.

== 14 October ==
List of shipwrecks: 14 October 1873
Ship	State	Description
Catarina	United Kingdom	The ship was driven ashore at Grand-Métis, Quebec, Canada. She was on a voyage from Quebec City to London.
City of Durham	United Kingdom	The ship was severely damaged by fire at Grimsby, Lincolnshire.

== 15 October ==
List of shipwrecks: 15 October 1873
Ship	State	Description
Canopus	United Kingdom	The steamship collided with the steamship Circassian (United Kingdom) and was severely damaged. Canopus was on a voyage from Alexandria, Egypt to Liverpool, Lancashire. She was taken in to Liverpool.
Catharina	Denmark	The schooner ran aground near Öregrund, Sweden. She was on a voyage from Ayr, United Kingdom to Örnsköldsvik, Sweden. She was refloated and take in to Gävle, Sweden.
Diligente II	Brazil	The ship was wrecked on the coast of Sergipe. Her crew were rescued. She was on a voyage from Liverpool to Penedo.
Ellen	United Kingdom	The fishing smack capsized and foundered in the Dogger Bank with the loss of three of her crew.
Emma	United Kingdom	The ship was driven ashore at Cape Recife, Cape Colony. She was on a voyage from an English port to Port Elizabeth, Cape Colony. She was refloated and taken in to Algoa Bay for repairs.
Wallsend	United Kingdom	The paddle tug collided with the steamship Sanspareil (United Kingdom) and sank at South Shields, County Durham. Her crew were rescued.
Waterloo	United Kingdom	The steamship ran aground in the Aardappelengat. She was on a voyage from Newcastle upon Tyne, Northumberland to Rotterdam, South Holland, Netherlands. She was refloated and taken in to Rotterdam.
581	Russia	The lighter heeled over and sank at Kronstadt.
Unnamed	France	The schooner collided with HMS Serapis (Royal Navy) and sank in the Indian Ocean with the loss of a crew member. Survivors were rescued by HMS Serapis. The schooner was on a voyage from Marseille, Bouches-du-Rhône to Java, Netherlands East Indies.

== 16 October ==
List of shipwrecks: 16 October 1873
Ship	State	Description
RMS Golconda	United Kingdom	The steamship struck the Cadda Rock, off Galle, Ceylon and was damaged. She was on a voyage from Southampton, Hampshire to Calcutta, India. She was taken in to Bombay, India for repairs.
Valery Jean	France	The brig was run down and sunk in the Mediterranean Sea by Serapis (Flag unknown) with the loss of a crew member. Valery Jean was on a voyage from "Guzeyeh" to Marseille, Bouches-du-Rhône.

== 17 October ==
List of shipwrecks: 17 October 1873
Ship	State	Description
Camilla	United Kingdom	The steamship was driven ashore at the Point of Cabedello, Portugal. She was refloated and resumed her voyage.
Jane	United Kingdom	The ship foundered off the Hunter's Rock. Her crew were rescued. She was on a voyage from Port Dinorwic, Caernarfonshire to Aberdeen.
Laura	Germany	The barque capsized at Londonderry, United Kingdom. She was later righted and placed under repair.
Lizzie Throop	United States	The schooner foundered in Lake Michigan with the loss of two of her four crew. She was on a voyage from Muskegon, Michigan to Chicago, Illinois.
Royal Minstrel	United Kingdom	The ship departed from Hyōgo, Japan for Falmouth, Cornwall. No further trace, presumed foundered with the loss of all hands.
Tecker Kess	Sweden	The steamship was beached. She was on a voyage from Saint Petersburg, Russia to Aberdeen.

== 18 October ==
List of shipwrecks: 18 October 1873
Ship	State	Description
Hinds	United Kingdom	The barque was driven ashore at Bolderāja, Russia. She was later refloated.
Unnamed	Flag unknown	The barque ran aground on the Great Burbo Bank, in Liverpool Bay. She was refloated and towed in to Liverpool, Lancashire, United Kingdom.

== 19 October ==
List of shipwrecks: 19 October 1873
Ship	State	Description
Commandeur	Norway	The brigantine was driven ashore at Narva, Russia. Her crew were rescued by the Narva Lifeboat. She was refloated in late November.
Fernando el Católico	Cantonalist Rebels	Cantonal rebellion: The gunboat collided with the broadside ironclad Numancia ( Cantonalist Rebels) and sank off the coast of the Canton of Cartagena with the loss of fifteen of her 238 crew.
Neptune	Sweden	The ship was wrecked on the Finngrundet, in the Baltic Sea. Her crew survived. She was on a voyage from Antwerp, Belgium to Gävle.
Peggy	United Kingdom	The sloop foundered off Cardigan. Her two crew were rescued by the St. Dogmael's Lifeboat John Stuart ( Royal National Lifeboat Institution). Peggy was on a voyage from Swansea, Glamorgan to Cardigan.
Sans Rofos	Flag unknown	The ship departed from the "Wanx River" for Falmouth, Cornwall or Queenstown, County Cork, United Kingdom. No further trace, presumed foundered with the loss of all hands.

== 20 October ==
List of shipwrecks: 20 October 1873
Ship	State	Description
Catharina	United Kingdom	The ship ran aground at L'Isle-aux-Coudres, Quebec, Canada. She was on a voyage from Quebec City to London. She was consequently condemned.
Connaught Ranger	United States	The schooner was wrecked at Fresh Water Cove. Crew saved.
Elida	United Kingdom	The ship was driven ashore at Rønne, Denmark. She was on a voyage from Riga, Russia to Liverpool, Lancashire.
Hendon	United Kingdom	The brig ran aground on the Cockle Sand, in the North Sea off the coast of Norfolk. She was refloated with the assistance of the Caister Lifeboat and a steamship and assisted in to Great Yarmouth in a leaky condition. Her nine crew were taken off by the Caister Lifeboat.
Niord	Norway	The schooner was abandoned at sea. Her four crew were rescued by the steamship Sweden (Sweden). Niord was on a voyage from Sunderland, County Durham, United Kingdom to Norway.
Ready Rhino	United Kingdom	The brig was driven ashore near Cairnryan, Wigtownshire. She was on a voyage from Ardrossan, Ayrshire to Dublin.
Star	United Kingdom	The ship was abandoned in the North Sea in a sinking condition. Her crew were rescued. She was on a voyage from Hamburg, Germany to Peterhead, Aberdeenshire.
Ticker	United Kingdom	The barquentine foundered off Caernarfon. Her seven crew survived. She was on a voyage from Barrow-in-Furness, Lancashire to Porthcawl, Glamorgan.

== 21 October ==
List of shipwrecks: 21 October 1873
Ship	State	Description
Anne	United Kingdom	The brigantine foundered off the Dudgeon Sandbank, in the North Sea. Her crew were rescued by Londonderry (United Kingdom. Anne was on a voyage from South Shields, County Durham to Faversham, Kent and/or London.
Ben Nevis	United Kingdom	The ship ran aground in Bootle Bay. She was on a voyage from Quebec City, Canada to Liverpool, Lancashire. She was refloated.
Coral Isle	United Kingdom	The ship was driven ashore at Skaarloch, Öland, Sweden. She was on a voyage from Kronstadt, Russia to Aberdeen. She was refloated and taken in to Kalmar, Sweden in a waterlogged condition.
Coriana	United Kingdom	The brigantine ran aground. She was on a voyage from South Shields, County Durham to Margate, Kent. She was refloated and taken in to Ramsgate, Kent in a severely leaky condition.
Dumfries	United Kingdom	The steamship was driven ashore and wrecked at Pullocheeny, County Sligo.
Eleven	United Kingdom	The sloop was driven ashore at Blackpool, Lancashire. Both crew were rescued. by the Blackpool Lifeboat.
Flint	United Kingdom	The ship ran aground in the River Mersey off Egremont, Lancashire. She was on a voyage from Liverpool, Lancashire to Maranhão, Brazil. She was refloated and towed in to Birkenhead, Cheshire.
Jane	United Kingdom	The brigantine foundered off the Dudgeon Sandbank, in the North Sea. Her crew were rescued. She was on a voyage from South Shields, County Durham to Faversham, Kent.
Liverpool	United Kingdom	The schooner was driven ashore and wrecked at Lendalfoot, Ayrshire. Her five crew were rescued. She was on a voyage from Belfast, County Antrim to Troon, Ayrshire.
Marie Boustead	France	The schooner was driven ashore at Girvan, Ayrshire. Her seven crew were rescued by the Girvan Lifeboat. She was on a voyage from Troon, Ayrshire to Saint-Malo, Ille-et-Vilaine.
Mary	United Kingdom	The steamship broke in two and sank in the Bay of Biscay. She was on a voyage from the Clyde to Trinidad.
Rose	United Kingdom	The smack was driven ashore at Lybster, Caithness. Her crew were rescued.
Sarah	United Kingdom	The schooner was abandoned off Solva, Pembrokeshire. Her four crew were rescued by the Solva Lifeboat.
Vasco de Gama	United Kingdom	The steamship ran aground in the Clyde at Bowling, Dunbartonshire. She was refloated.
William Griffiths	United Kingdom	The sloop was driven ashore and wrecked at Berwick upon Tweed, Northumberland.

== 22 October ==
List of shipwrecks: 22 October 1873
Ship	State	Description
British Banner	United Kingdom	The barque collided with the steamship Hibernia (United Kingdom) and sank in the North Sea off the coast of Essex, United Kingdom with the loss of eight of her ten crew. Survivors were rescued by Hibernia. British Banner was on a voyage from London to Newcastle upon Tyne, Northumberland.
Elizabeth Cicely	(United Kingdom of Great Britain and Ireland) Guernsey	The ship ran aground on the Girdler Sand and sank. Her crew were rescued.
Hilda	United Kingdom	The steamship ran aground and was wrecked in the Baltic Sea 2 nautical miles (3.7 km) south of Ventava, Courland Governorate. Nine of her crew were rescued. She was on a voyage from Newport, Monmouthshire to Riga, Russia.
Scott	United Kingdom	The barque was wrecked on the Kentish Knock. Her ten crew were rescued by the Ramsgate Lifeboat Bradford ( Royal National Lifeboat Institution) and the tug Aid (United Kingdom). Scott was on a voyage from Sunderland, County Durham to Algiers, Algeria.
St. Peter	United Kingdom	The brig foundered in the English Channel off Beachy Head, Sussex. She was on a voyage from Llanelly, Glamorgan to Dieppe, Seine-Inférieure, France.
Unnamed	United Kingdom	The Thames barge sank off Beckton, Essex with the loss of both crew.
Unnamed	United Kingdom	The ship foundered off Fjällbacka, Sweden.

== 23 October ==
List of shipwrecks: 23 October 1873
Ship	State	Description
Golden Fleece	United Kingdom	The smack foundered in the Dogger Bank. Her crew were rescued by the smack Bravo (United Kingdom).
Mersey	United Kingdom	The schooner struck a submerged object and sank in Swansea Bay. Her crew were rescued. She was on a voyage from Cardiff, Glamorgan to Waterford.
Renfrewshire	United Kingdom	The ship was sighted off Bic, Quebec, Canada whilst on a voyage from Quebec City, Canada to the Clyde. No further trace, presumed foundered with the loss of all hands.
Sarah	United Kingdom	The ship was driven ashore near Milford Haven, Pembrokeshire.
Susan A. Blaisdall	United States	The barque was driven ashore in Swansea Bay. She was on a voyage from Swansea, Glamorgan to Havana, Cuba. She was refloated and towed in to Swansea.
Village Belle	United Kingdom	The pilot boat collided with the pilot boat True Blue (United Kingdom) and sank in the Bristol Channel off Lundy Island, Devon. All three people on board were rescued by True Blue.
Two unnamed vessels	United Kingdom	The Mersey Flats were run into by the steamship Glengarry (United Kingdom), which was being launched at Liverpool, Lancashire. One flat sank, the other was beached. The crewman on the flat that sank was rescued by the flat which was beached.
Unnamed	Flag unknown	The schooner capsized and sank in the English Channel 5 nautical miles (9.3 km) south by east of Beachy Head, Sussex, United Kingdom.

== 26 October ==
List of shipwrecks: 26 October 1873
Ship	State	Description
Carmen	Spain	The schooner was wrecked in a typhoon at Manila, Spanish East Indies.
Courser	United States	The whaler, a barque, was run into by the steamship Italia (United Kingdom in the Pacific Ocean 25 nautical miles (46 km) off Talcahuano, Chile. Italia towed the waterlogged Courser in to Talcahuano.
Esmeralda	Spain	The schooner was wrecked in a typhoon at Manila.
George Clark	United Kingdom	The brig was driven ashore. She was on a voyage from Vyborg, Grand Duchy of Finland to Lowestoft, Suffolk.
Hotspur	United Kingdom	The ship ran aground in Lake Saint Pierre. She was on a voyage from London to Montreal, Quebec, Canada.
Poseidon	Greece	The brig was destroyed by fire at Buenos Aires, Argentina.

== 27 October ==
List of shipwrecks: 27 October 1873
Ship	State	Description
Cormorant	United Kingdom	The steamship collided with the steamship Skerryvore (United Kingdom) and was beached in the River Lee. She was on a voyage from Cork to Cardiff, Glamorgan. She was refloated the next day and resumed her voyage.
Express	Italy	The ship was driven ashore and wrecked at Point Piedras, Argentina. Her crew were rescued. She was on a voyage from Tarragona, Spain to Buenos Aires, Argentina.
Macedon	United Kingdom	The steamship foundered off Kinnaird Head, Aberdeenshire. Her thirteen crew survived. She was on a voyage from Berwick upon Tweed, Northumberland to Glasgow, Renfrewshire.
Oradd	Sweden	The schooner ran aground near Loshavn, Norway. She was on a voyage from Skellefteå to Grangemouth, Stirlingshire, United Kingdom. She was refloated and taken in to Farsund, Norway in a severely leaky condition.
Salisbury	United Kingdom	The brigantine was driven ashore at Ballyquinton Point, County Down. She was on a voyage from Ardrossan, Ayrshire to Dundalk, County Louth. She was refloated and resumed her voyage.
Temon	United Kingdom	The steamship was run into by the steamship Sentinel (United Kingdom) and sank at South Shields, County Durham. Her crew were rescued. She was refloated.

== 28 October ==
List of shipwrecks: 28 October 1873
Ship	State	Description
Sir Walter Scott	United Kingdom	The ship departed from Rangoon, Burma for Liverpool, Lancashire. No further trace, presumed foundered with the loss of all hands.

== 29 October ==
List of shipwrecks: 29 October 1873
Ship	State	Description
Britannia	United Kingdom	The tug sank at Aberdeen.
Clara	United Kingdom	The ketch was abandoned 20 nautical miles (37 km) south west of Cádiz, Spain. Her crew were rescued by the steamship Russell (United Kingdom). Clara was on a voyage from Seville, Spain to Antwerp, Belgium.
Monkhaven	United Kingdom	The barque was driven ashore at Tanarak Point, Ottoman Empire, in the Sea of Marmara. She was on a voyage from Newcastle upon Tyne, Northumberland to Galaţi, Ottoman Empire.
Pilot	United Kingdom	The tug was destroyed by fire at Middlesbrough, Yorkshire.
Pride of the Ocean	United Kingdom	The smack was damaged by fire at Leith, Lothian.

== 30 October ==
List of shipwrecks: 30 October 1873
Ship	State	Description
Amoy	United Kingdom	The ship was wrecked on the Isla de Lobos, Uruguay. She was on a voyage from Cardiff, Glamorgan to Montevideo, Uruguay.
Blanche	United Kingdom	The steamship collided with the steamship Dodo (United Kingdom) and sank in the River Thames at Blackwall, Middlesex.
Scrabster	United Kingdom	The ship ran aground on the Whitby Rock. She was on a voyage from Seaham, County Durham to London. She was refloated and resumed her voyage.
Success	United Kingdom	The steamship was driven ashore at Newbiggin-by-the-Sea, Northumberland. She was on a voyage from Hull, Yorkshire to the River Tyne. She was refloated with assistance and resumed her voyage.
Tetuán	Cantonalist Rebels	Cantonal rebellion: The Protected frigate exploded and sank while under repair at Cartagena, Canton of Cartagena, Spain.

== 31 October ==
List of shipwrecks: 31 October 1873
Ship	State	Description
Alfavata	United States	The brig was driven ashore and wrecked at Portici, Italy. Her crew were rescued.
Granatbella	Italy	The brigantine was driven ashore and wrecked at Torre del Greco with the loss of all hands.
Henrietta	United Kingdom	The barque was driven ashore in Swansea Bay. She was on a voyage from Sundsvall, Sweden to Swansea, Glamorgan. She was refloated on 1 November and towed in to Swansea.
John Sauber	Germany	The steamship ran aground in the Elbe off Wittenbergen.
Magician	United Kingdom	The brig was driven ashore and wrecked near "Cape Razo", Portugal. Her crew were rescued by St. George (France). Magician was on a voyage from Pomaron, Portugal to Maryport, Cumberland.
Rosa	Norway	The barque ran aground on the Goodwin Sands, Kent, United Kingdom and broke in two with the loss of all but one of her crew. The survivor waw rescued by a fishing smack. She was on a voyage from Liverpool, Lancashire to Fredrikstad.

== Unknown date ==
List of shipwrecks: Unknown date in October 1873
Ship	State	Description
Abelene Kjerstine	Flag unknown	The schooner ran aground east of Kronstadt, Russia. She was refloated and put back to Saint Petersburg, Russia.
Adolf	Sweden	The ship was beached in "Eilosfjor". She was on a voyage from Newcastle upon Tyne, Northumberland, United Kingdom to Uddevalla.
Adrienne	France	The barque ran aground and was wrecked. She was on a voyage from Sierra Leone to Nantes, Loire-Inférieure.
Almo	United Kingdom	The ship was wrecked on "Wiran". She was on a voyage from Kronstadt to Grimsby, Lincolnshire.
Amor	United Kingdom	The ship was driven ashore. She was on a voyage from Liverpool, Lancashire to Quebec City, Canada. She was refloated and resumed her voyage.
Anna	Germany	The galiot collided with the steamship Artos (United Kingdom) and sank off Naissaar, Russia. Her crew were rescued by Artos.
Anna Elizabeth	Germany	The ship collided with Catharina (United Kingdom) and was abandoned by her crew. Anna Elizabeth was on a voyage from Newcastle upon Tyne to Heiligenhafen.
Anne	United Kingdom	The schooner ran aground at Lavernock Point, Glamorgan. She was on a voyage from Ballinacurra, County Cork to Cardiff, Glamorgan. She was refloated and taken in to Cardiff.
Ann Susan	United Kingdom	The schooner was driven ashore. She was on a voyage from "Cumberland Harbour" to New York. She was refloated and put in to Nassau, Bahamas in a leaky condition.
Arcona	Germany	The steamship was driven ashore near Kronstadt.
Ariel	United States	The steamship foundered in the Inland Sea of Japan. All on board were rescued. She was on a voyage from Yokohama to Hakodate, Japan.
Argyle	United Kingdom	The lighter foundered in the Firth of Clyde with the loss of all hands. Wreckage came ashore south of the Cloch Lighthouse, Renfrewshire.
Assebur	India	The ship caught fire at sea. She was on a voyage from London to India. She was assisted in to "Henjam" by Punjaub (India).
Caledonia	United Kingdom	The ship ran aground on the Shipwash Sand, in the North Sea off the coast of Suffolk. She was refloated and taken in to Harwich, Essex.
Campanero	Brazil	The ship was driven ashore in Chesapeake Bay. She was on a voyage from Rio de Janeiro to Baltimore, Maryland, United States. She was refloated and completed her voyage.
Caroline	United Kingdom	The ship ran aground. She was on a voyage from Gävle, Sweden to Ipswich, Suffolk. She was refloated and put in to Gothenburg, Sweden in a waterlogged condition.
Carona	United Kingdom	The barque was lost at sea.
Catharina	United Kingdom	The ship ran aground at the mouth of the Tartigou River. She was on a voyage from Quebec City to London. She was refloated on 18 October with assistance from the steamship Conqueror ( Canada).
Cerops	United Kingdom	The schooner ran aground near "Ceynowna". She was on a voyage from London to Königsberg, Germany. She was refloated and put in to Danzig, Germany.
Chanonry	France	The steamship was wrecked at the "Tignes Faraman", near Marseille, Bouches-du-Rhône with the loss of two lives. She was on a voyage from the Danube to Marseille.
Charlotte	Sweden	The brig was driven ashore on Terschelling, Friesland, Netherlands. She was on a voyage from Skellefteå to Ghent, East Flanders, Belgium. She was later refloated and taken in to a Dutch port in a waterlogged condition.
Charrúa	Uruguay	The steamship was wrecked.
Cingalese	United Kingdom	The steamship collided with the steamship Earl King (United Kingdom and was severely damaged. She was beached at North Sydney, Nova Scotia, Canada. She was on a voyage from the Clyde to Montreal, Quebec, Canada. She had been refloated by 11 November.
Clifford, and Johana	United Kingdom; Ottoman Empire	The steamships collided in the Bosphorus. Johana sank. Her crew were rescued by Clifford. Clifford was beached. She was on a voyage from Sulina, Ottoman Empire to A British port.
Columbia	United Kingdom	The steamship ran aground at Skutskär, Sweden. She was on a voyage from Cardiff, Glamorgan to Skutskär. She was refloated and found to be severely leaky. She was taken in to Stockholm, Sweden.
Cumberland	United Kingdom	The brig was driven ashore near Killybegs, County Donegal. Her crew were rescued.
Daniel Auber	France	The barque ran aground at Sierra Leone. She was on a voyage from Marseille to Sierra Leone. She was refloated.
Darien	United States	The steamship was driven ashore. She was on a voyage from Liverpool to Savannah, Georgia. She was refloated and taken in to Bermuda in a severely leaky condition and placed under repair.
Do Tichy	Greece	The ship foundered off "Castithos". Her crew were rescued. She was on a voyage from Marseille to Buenos Aires, Argentina.
Deerhound	United Kingdom	The ship was driven ashore on the coast of Borneo before 20 October. She was refloated and resumed her voyage.
Elizabeth Knowles	United Kingdom	The ship was beached in the Tubb Inlet. She was on a voyage from Wilmington, North Carolina, United States to Queenstown, County Cork.
Elizabeth Marie	United States	The schooner was abandoned in the North Sea in a sinking condition. She was on a voyage from Alloa, Clackmannanshire, United Kingdom to Christiania and/or Kristiansand, Norway.
Emma	United Kingdom	The ship was driven ashore at Balbriggan, County Dublin. She was on a voyage from Maryport, Cumberland to Dublin.
Esmeralda	France	The ship was towed in to Stockholm in a sinking condition. She was on a voyage from Sundsvall, Sweden to Bordeaux, Gironde.
Evening Star	United Kingdom	The barque ran aground in "Cumberland Harbour".
Express	United Kingdom	The ship was driven ashore on Ven, Sweden. She was on a voyage from Gävle to Dublin. She was refloated and taken Helsingør, Denmark.
Farnley Hall	United Kingdom	The steamship ran aground at "Sandiglar", Ottoman Empire. She was on a voyage from Port Said, Egypt to Odesa, Russia. She was refloated on 11 October and resumed her voyage.
Fleche	United Kingdom	The smack was driven ashore at Lowestoft, Suffolk. She was refloated and taken in to Lowestoft.
Francois Joseph	United Kingdom	The ship struck a sunken rock and became leaky. She put in to Guayaquil, Ecuador.
Gamay	United States	The ship foundered. She was on a voyage from Fortune Island, Bahamas to Boston, Massachusetts.
Gio Batta	Flag unknown	The barque was destroyed by fire 8 nautical miles (15 km) from "Nagara". Her crew were rescued. She was on a voyage from Hull, Yorkshire, United Kingdom to Odesa.
Gondola	United Kingdom	The ship was driven ashore and wrecked near Vaasa, Grand Duchy of Finland.
Harvestman	United Kingdom	The ship was driven ashore at Bonny, Africa.
Humbleton	United Kingdom	The barque was wrecked on Cape Sable Island, Nova Scotia. Her crew were rescued. She was on a voyage from London to New York.
Ida Lilly	United Kingdom	The full-rigged ship was severely damaged by fire. She was on a voyage from Rotterdam, South Holland, Netherlands to an American port. She put back to Rotterdam.
Iris	Germany	The ship ran aground. She was on a voyage from Hamburg to Valparaíso, Chile. She was refloated.
Isabel Beurman	United States	The ship foundered. She was on a voyage from Navassa Island to Baltimore, Maryland.
Isle of Skye	United Kingdom	The ship was abandoned at sea. She was on a voyage from Progreso to Liverpool.
Jacob	Denmark	The ship was driven ashore at Lohme, Germany. She was on a voyage from Hartlepool, County Durham to Stettin, Germany. She subsequently became a wreck.
Jamaica	United Kingdom	The barque was wrecked on the Folly Reef. Her crew were rescued.
Jamaica	United Kingdom	The barque ran aground in the Baltic Sea. She was on a voyage from Stettin to "Paudula". She was refloated and taken in to Copenhagen, Denmark in a leaky condition. She waws placedunder repair.
Jean Bart	France	The ship was wrecked off Fjällbacka, Sweden with the loss of two of her crew. She was on a voyage from Saint-Malo, Ille-et-Vilaine to Fredrikstad, Denmark.
J. Polledo	United Kingdom	The ship was driven ashore on the Delaware Breakwater. She was on a voyage from Sagua La Grande, Cuba to Philadelphia, Pennsylvania.
Juliane Wilhelmine	Denmark	The ship was driven ashore at Nymindegab. Her crew were rescued.
Juan Ferrin	Uruguay	The ship was destroyed by fire at sea. She was on a voyage from Liverpool to Montevideo.
Kate	United Kingdom	The schooner was driven ashore at Hellevoetsluis, Zeeland, Netherlands. She was on a voyage from Harrington, Cumberland to Rotterdam. She was refloated and taken in to Hellevoetsluis.
Kedron	United Kingdom	The ship was driven ashore and severely damaged at Eastport, Maine, United States. She was on a voyage from Saint John, New Brunswick, Canada to Liverpool. She was refloated and taken in to Eastport.
Lamb	United Kingdom	The brig was wrecked at Brouwershaven, Zeeland, Netherlands. Her crew were rescued by a Dutch pilot cutter. She was on a voyage from Sunderland, County Durham to Dordrecht, South Holland.
Leander	United Kingdom	The ship was abandoned in the Atlantic Ocean. She was on a voyage from Buenos Aires to Pensacola, Florida, United States.
Lemvig	Norway	The schooner was driven ashore and wrecked in Lemfjord. Her crew were rescued. She was on a voyage from Hartlepool to Norway.
Lioness, or Times	United Kingdom	The smack ran aground on the Arklow Bank, in the Irish Sea off the coast of County Wicklow. Her crew were rescued. She was on a voyage from Wicklow to Antwerp, Belgium.
Lord Reidhaven	United Kingdom	The schooner was wrecked at Lossiemouth, Moray. Her four crew were rescued by the Lossiemouth Lifeboat.
L. W. Eaton	Canada	The ship was driven ashore on White Island. She was on a voyage from Bras d'Or, Nova Scotia to Montreal. She was refloated and taken in to Quebec City in a severely damaged condition.
Marie Bertha	Norway	The schooner ran aground at Messina, Sicily, Italy.
Marschall	Germany	The steamship was run down and sunk in the Kattegat by the steamship Oscar II (Sweden). Her crew were rescued. Marschall was on a voyage from Antwerp to Riga, Russia.
Mary	United Kingdom	The sloop was wrecked at Ayr. She was on a voyage from Belfast, County Antrim to Campbeltown, Argyllshire.
Mary Richmond	Germany	The ship ran aground on the Steilsand, in the North Sea. She was on a voyage from Hamburg to Lagos.
Mary Stuart	United Kingdom	The schooner capsized in the Baltic Sea between 20 and 27 October after her cargo of rapeseed shifted. Her crew were rescued. She was on a voyage from Pillau, Germany to Caen, Calvados, France.
Medway	United Kingdom	The steamship was wrecked in the Strait of Belle Isle with the loss of nine lives.
Meridian	United States	The schooner sank in Lake Michigan off Sister Bay, Wisconsin, during a storm.
Mindora	Flag unknown	The steamship struck a sunken rock and foundered off Masbate, Spanish East Indies with some loss of life.
Minnie Howell	Canada	The ship was driven ashore in the Bras d'Or Lake. She was on a voyage from Quebec City to Havana, Cuba.
Mr. Johan Herman Geertsema	Netherlands	The ship was wrecked. Her crew were rescued. She was on a voyage from Liverpool to Tabasco, Mexico.
Nancy	United Kingdom	The brig was driven ashore on "Gronhos", Denmark. She was on a voyage from Christiania to Middlesbrough, Yorkshire.
Nea Fyche	France	The ship foundered off "Castellos". Her crew were rescued. She was on a voyage from Marseille to Buenos Aires.
Pace P.	Austria-Hungary	The brig was wrecked at Cape Anguille, Newfoundland Colony with the loss of five of her crew. She was on a voyage from Montreal to Cork.
Pau	Norway	The brig was abandoned in the Baltic Sea. Her crew were rescued. She was on a voyage from Rouen, Seine-Inférieure to Kronstadt. She was towed in to Helsinki, Grand Duchy of Finland on 19 October.
Persian	United Kingdom	The barque was abandoned at sea. Her crew were rescued by Cambridge (United Kingdom). Persian was on a voyage from Limerick to Miramichi, New Brunswick.
Prince of Wales	New Zealand	The ship was wrecked. All on board were rescued. She was on a voyage from Rarotonga to "Manguea Island".
Prins Hendrik	Netherlands	The ship collided with The Brothers (United Kingdom) and sank in the Gulf of Suez before 30 October. Her crew were rescued.
Rapid	United Kingdom	The ship was driven ashore at "Berthier Embas". She was on a voyage from Quebec City to "Moise".
Reine Marie	France	The ship collided with the steamship Alfred Euthalie (France) and was beached. She was on a voyage from Basse-Indre to Nantes, Loire-Inférieure.
Queen of the Clyde	United Kingdom	The ship was driven ashore and wrecked in the Strait of Belle Isle. She was on a voyage from Quebec City to Greenock, Renfrewshire.
Rivoli	Canada	The barque was wrecked on Duck Island, Wadham Islands, Newfoundland Colony with the loss of a crew member. She was on a voyage from the West Indies to Quebec City.
Salus	United Kingdom	The schooner was driven ashore at Sellafield, Cumberland. She was on a voyage from Liverpool to Stettin. She was refloated in early November and taken in to Whitehaven, Cumberland.
Sarah	United Kingdom	The schooner was wrecked in St. Bride's Bay. Her crew were rescued by the Solva Lifeboat.
Scilla	Italy	The steamship ran aground on the Meleoria Bank.
Scotia	United Kingdom	The ship was wrecked in the Strait of Belle Isle before 21 October.
Scotsman	United Kingdom	The schooner was driven ashore on Öland, Sweden. She was on a voyage from Saint Petersburg to Arbroath, Forfarshire. She was refloated and taken in to Copenhagen.
Sir G. F. Seymour	United Kingdom	The ship ran aground. She was on a voyage from London to Bermuda. She was refloated and towed in to Bermuda.
Southern Chief	United States	The ship was driven ashore on Bedloes Island, New York. She was on a voyage from New York to Antwerp. She was refloated with the assistance of tugs.
Speedwell	(United Kingdom of Great Britain and Ireland) Guernsey	The brig was holed by her anchor off the Shipwash Sand, in the North Sea off the coast of Suffolk and was abandoned. Her seven crew took to a boat; they were rescued by the brig Despatch (United Kingdom). Speedwell was on a voyage from London to South Shields.
St. Paul	United Kingdom	The ship ran aground. She was on a voyage from Saint Petersburg, Russia to Sutton Bridge, Lincolnshire. She was refloated and towed in to Grimstad, Norway.
St. Peter	United Kingdom	The brigantine foundered. Her crew were rescued by Shalimar (United Kingdom).
Tagus	United Kingdom	The steamship was driven ashore at Sydney, Nova Scotia.
Thalia	Germany	The ship was wrecked on the Horns Reef on or after 18 October. She was on a voyage from Bremerhaven to Philadelphia, Pennsylvania, United States.
Three Brothers	United Kingdom	The ship was run down in the Atlantic Ocean before 7 October.
Titan	United Kingdom	The barque caught fire at Montevideo before 11 October and was scuttled. She was severely damaged.
Tris	Norway	The full-rigged ship collided with another vessel and put in to Gothenburg in a waterlogged condition. She was on a voyage from Örnsköldvik, Sweden to South Alloa, Clackmannanshire, United Kingdom.
Trowbridge	United Kingdom	The ship was driven ashore at Beaumont, Quebec. She was on a voyage from Quebec City to London. She was refloated with the assistance of the tug Margaret ( Canada and resumed her voyage.
Vafidakis	Greece	The brig caught fire and was beached at Tenedos, Ottoman Empire. She was on a voyage from Grimsby to Constantinople, Ottoman Empire. The fire was extinguished and she resumed her voyage. She was later refloated and towed in to Pera, Ottoman Empire.
Valladachi	Greece	The ship was scuttled in the Dardanelles. She was on a voyage from Hull to an Ottoman port. She was later refloated and taken in to Pera, Ottoman Empire.
Victoria	Germany	The full-rigged ship was driven ashore at Merlimont, Pas-de-Calais, France. She was on a voyage from Iquique, Peru to Hamburg. She subsequently became a wreck.
Victoria	Germany	The ship was driven ashore at Heilingenhafen. Her crew were rescued. She was on a voyage from Memel to Lübeck.
Ville de Bayonne	France	The steamship caught fire off Bayonne, Basses-Pyrénées and was abandoned. Her crew too to two boats; one reached shore at Mimizan, Landes, those in the other were rescued by a fishing smack. She was on a voyage from Bayonne to Antwerp.
Vinco	United Kingdom	The ship was abandoned at sea.
Volharding	Netherlands	The brig was driven ashore at "Carlos". She was on a voyage from Pernambuco, Brazil to Reval, Russia. She was refloated and takent in to Reval.
W. A. Campbell	United Kingdom	The ship ran aground on the Mantanilla Reef, off the Bahamas before 27 October. She was on a voyage from Liverpool to Mobile, Alabama, United States. She was refloated and completed her voyage.
Walter Baine	United Kingdom	The ship was destroyed by fire at sea. Her crew were rescued by Grenada. Walter Baine was on a voyage from Dundee, Forfarshire to Calcutta, India.
William	United Kingdom	The schooner was driven ashore at Waterloo, Lancashire and was abandoned by her crew. She was refloated and towed in to Liverpool, Lancashire by the tug Guiding Star (United Kingdom).
Zeebloem	Netherlands	The ship was lost in the "Gulf of Belang". She was on a voyage from Surabaya to Menado, Netherlands East Indies.
386	Russia	The lighter sank at Kronstadt.
Unnamed	United Kingdom	The schooner was abandoned by her crew and sank off Caernarfon.
Unnamed	Flag unknown	The barque ran aground on the Girdler Sand, in the North Sea off the coast of Essex and sank.
Unnamed	United Kingdom	The steamship ran aground on the Nash Sands, in the Bristol Channel off the coast of Glamorgan.
