= Captain Sutter =

Captain Sutter, sometimes mistakenly called the Sutter, or the John A. Sutter, was a stern-wheel steamboat, built in Philadelphia, brought around Cape Horn, to California, the first to run from San Francisco to Stockton, from late November 1849.

== History ==
=== Aspinwall Steam Transportation Line ===
Originally constructed in Philadelphia for George W. Aspinwall, brother of William Henry Aspinwall, president of the Pacific Mail Steamship Company. Captain Sutter was a single engine, stern-wheel steamer, 90 feet long, 18 feet on the beam, and a 6 foot deep hold. It was knocked down and shipped to California, where it was the first steamboat built by Domingo Marcucci at his new boatyard on the beach of Yerba Buena Cove at Happy Valley, at the foot of Folsom Street, east of Beale Street. Marcucci's company assembled the Captain Sutter in six weeks. Captained by Issac Warren, it was the first steamboat that ran between San Francisco and Stockton, beginning in late November 1849. The Captain Sutter earned $300,000 in its first eight months on the route.

The Captain Sutter ran twice weekly to Stockton for the Aspinwall Steam Transportation Line. By February 1850, the Line had added the El Dorado running to Sacramento and the Sacramento running to San Jose, both twice weekly. By that summer the El Dorado made the run to Stockton making connections with the Captain Sutter which was put on the run up the San Joaquin River to Grayson City and the Tuolumne River to Tuolumne City with the Georgiana. The steamer Captain Sutter was run daily on this route until June, 1850, when she was sent to run in the Sacramento River above Sacramento. The Georgiana continued until low water that summer stranded her and ended steamboat runs to Tuolumne City for several years.

Aspinwall Steam Transportation Line offered the Captain Sutter and other steamboats and its other boats and barges for sale from November, 1850.

=== Later Owners ===
By December 5, 1850, Captain Sutter was advertised as a mail steamer running between Sacramento and Marysville every Tuesday, Thursday and Saturday, under Captain E. G. Lamb. From April 1851 it was running from San Francisco to Marysville, and intermediate landings, under Captain J. Whitney, Jr.

In August 1851 Captain Sutter was advertised as a Sunday excursion boat to Contra Costa and on all other alternate days running between San Francisco and Sonoma under Master R. L. Robertson. From October 1851, the Captain Sutter was running between San Francisco, to Sacramento and Colusa under Captain Thomas Grey.

From February 15, 1852 the Captain Sutter was running between Sacramento and Colusa under a new Captain M. Littleton, on Tuesdays and Fridays. Returning, on Mondays and Fridays. In May 1852 Captain Sutter was repaired and improved in a San Francisco shipyard. Its return was heralded in an article in the Sacramento Daily Union:

"Steamer Captain Sutter. This steamer, well known to travelers on the Upper Sacramento as one of the most regular of the Colusa packets, appeared at the Levee last week, in an entirely new dress. She has been on the dock at San Francisco for sometime past, undergoing repairs and improvements, and now has a spacious cabin containing four state rooms and thirty commodious berths. This, with other additions which have been made at an outlay of over four thousand dollars, renders her one of the best steamers in the up-river trade. The Capt. S. resumes her trips to-morrow, taking her former days of departure, Wednesday and Saturday. Capt. Littleton continues to command the Sutter, which, to those who know him, is a sufficient guarantee of receiving that courtesy and attention proverbial with Mississippi steamboat captains."

After being refitted, in late May 1852, the Captain Sutter was again running from San Francisco, to Sacramento and Colusa under Littleton. Advertisements show it was operated by Littleton on this route at least until after October 7, 1852. On April 30, 1853, advertisement declared that the Captain Sutter with its new captain G. N. Spencer would leave Sacramento for Colusa every Wednesday and Saturday at 4 clock. P. M. to connect there with the stagecoach for Shasta.

== Fate ==
The last advertisement mentioning the Captain Sutter in the October 7, 1853 Sacramento Daily Union mentions the steamer, now under the command of Jas W. Smith, "will leave Sacramento for Colusa on SUNDAY NEXT, at 12 M..Oct. 9th." No further word of the Captain Sutter appears in the newspaper advertisements or news stories beyond this date.
