= Staten Island (disambiguation) =

Staten Island is a borough of New York City.

Staten Island may also refer to:

== Places ==
- Staten Island (California), riverine island northeast of Stockton
- Isla de los Estados, also known as "Staten Island", off Tierra del Fuego, Argentina
- Staten Island (phantom island), placed north of Japan by Maarten Gerritszoon Vries, now believed to be Iturup

== Other uses ==
- Staten Island (film), by James DeMonaco (2009)
- USCGC Staten Island (WAGB-278), former United States Coast Guard icebreaker

== See also ==
- Generality Lands, lands directly controlled by the States General of the Seven Provinces of the Netherlands
- The King of Staten Island, 2020 film by Judd Apatow
- Staten Landt, Abel Tasman's original name for New Zealand
