= El Dorado (side-wheeler) =

El Dorado was a 153 ton side-wheel steamship, was ordered by Captain J. W. Wright and built by Thomas Collyer. It was originally to be named Caribbean; however she was sold while still on the stocks to Howland & Aspinwall, who were building up a fleet of steamers on the Atlantic Ocean.

== Aspinwall Steam Transportation Line ==
After news of the California Gold Rush was arrived, George W. Aspinwall, of Philadelphia then had Thomas Young in Wilmington, Delaware, have El Dorado rigged as a 3-masted schooner to sail around Cape Horn to San Francisco Bay. Upon reaching San Francisco in February 1850, Aspinwall had Domingo Marcucci take down the masts and rigging to convert it for running as a steamboat on the Sacramento River between San Francisco and Sacramento. The Aspinwall Line had El Dorado running twice weekly on this run against the 327-ton Mckim and 755-ton Senator of Simmons, Hutchinson & Company.

By that spring the El Dorado had been switched to the run to Stockton, making connections with the Captain Sutter which was put on the run up the San Joaquin River to Grayson City and the Tuolumne River to Tuolumne City with the Georgiana. The steamer Captain Sutter was run daily on this route until June 1850, when she was sent to run in the Sacramento River above Sacramento.

Faced with the mushrooming numbers of steamers appearing on all the rivers, the Aspinwall Steam Transportation Line offered the El Dorado, Captain Sutter, its other steamboats and its other boats and barges for sale from November 1850.

== Later Owners ==
El Dorado was purchased by June 1851 by the San Francisco Towboat Company run by James Blair, formerly manager of the Aspinwall Line in San Francisco. El Dorado and steam tugs Firefly and Redding were used for towing ships in San Francisco Bay, "to the heads at all times or to any part of the bay and harbor."
