= Cyrus Walker =

19th cent. steamboat in United States

- Cyrus Walker in 1893

History
- Name: Cyrus Walker
- Owner: Pope & Talbot
- Route: Puget Sound
- Ordered: 1864
- Builder: Domingo Marcucci at Steamboat Point, San Francisco
- Laid down: 1864
- Launched: 1864
- Completed: 1864
- In service: 1864 - 1893?

General characteristics Cyrus Walker
- Class & type: Side-wheel Steam tug
- Length: 120
- Beam: 28
- Depth: 8
- Decks: two (main and passenger)
- Installed power: two high-pressure steam engines
- Propulsion: side-wheels

Cyrus Walker was a sidewheel tug active in Puget Sound in the second half of the 19th century.

== Career ==
Domingo Marcucci built the Cyrus Walker at San Francisco, California at his Steamboat Point shipyard in 1864, for Pope & Talbot. She was 120 foot long side-wheel steamboat, with a 28-foot beam and an 8-foot hold. She was equipped with two high-pressure steam engines and a surface condenser. George W Bullene, who put machinery in her at the Pacific Iron Works, then took her up to Puget Sound for towing logs for the Pope & Talbot lumber mill on Puget Sound.

Captain Bullene delivered Cyrus Walker to Port Gamble, Puget Sound in October, 1864. It was active at least as late as 1893.
