= Bouldin Island =

Island in California, U.S.

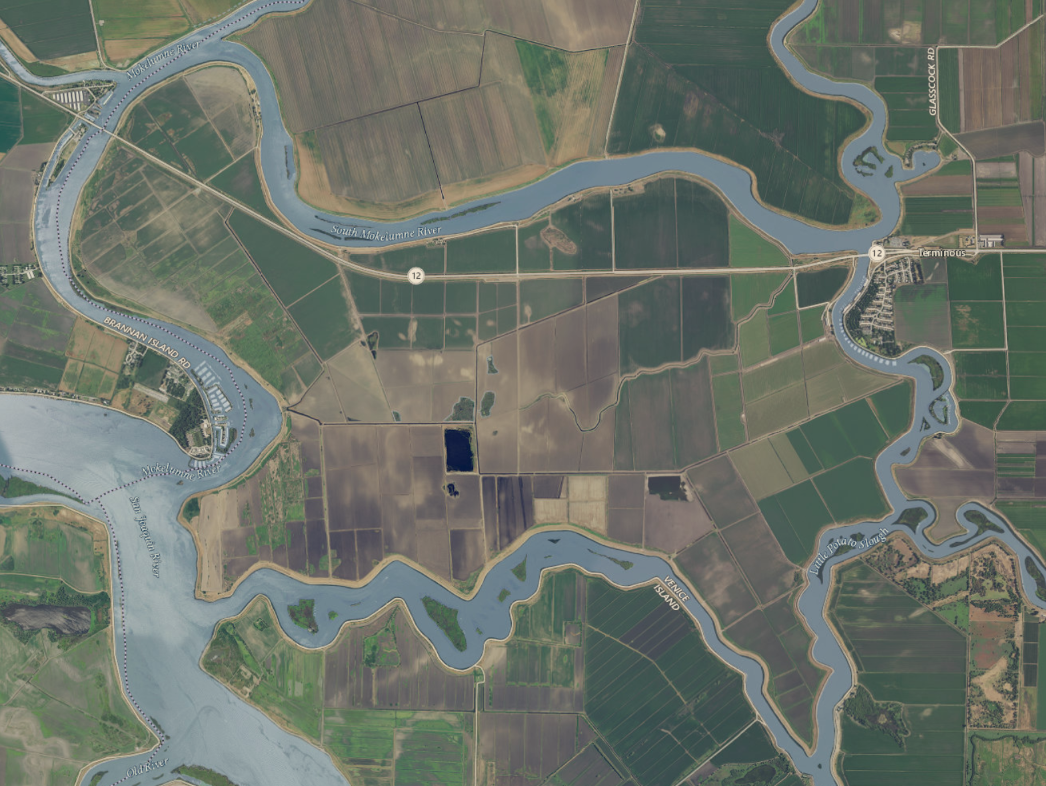
- USGS aerial imagery of the island.

- Location within Sacramento-San Joaquin River Delta Location within California Location within the United States

Geography
- Location: Northern California
- Coordinates: 38.1040°N 121.5347°W
- Adjacent to: Sacramento-San Joaquin River Delta
- Area: 5,900 acres (2,400 ha)

Administration
- United States
- State: California
- County: San Joaquin

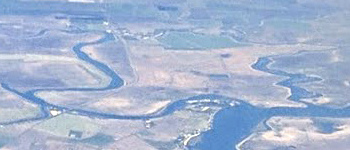
Bouldin Island in an aerial photo taken looking toward the east in 2018.

Bouldin Island is an island in the Sacramento-San Joaquin River Delta, 20 kilometers (12 mi) northwest of Stockton on the Stockton Deepwater Shipping Channel. It is in San Joaquin County, and managed by Reclamation District 756. The island is owned by the Metropolitan Water District of Southern California.

== Geography ==
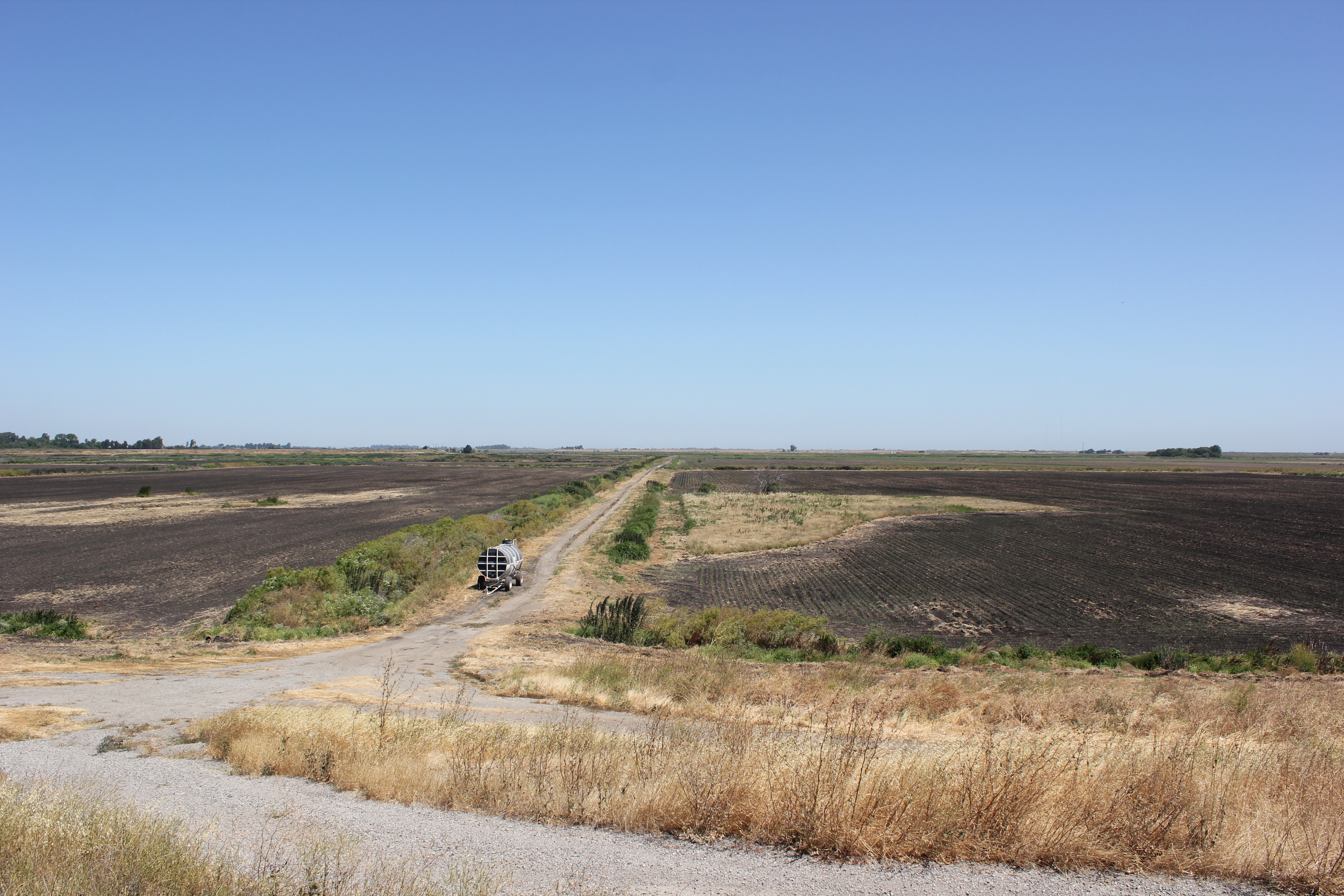
A raised gravel path snakes off into the distance between two fields plowed neatly into roads on Bouldin Island.

The 2,400 ha (5,900-acre) island is bounded to the north by South Mokelumne River which separates the island from Staten Island. To the east, the island is bounded by Little Potato Slough, to the south by Potato Slough, and to the west by the Mokelumne River.

State Route 12 crosses the northern section of Bouldin Island, which is also called Kettleman Lane on the island.

A swing bridge over the Mokelumne River on SR 12 connects the northwestern part of the island to Andrus Island. Near the northeastern tip of Bouldin Island, a high-level bridge on SR 12 spans Little Potato Slough connecting the island to Stockton, California.

== See also ==
- List of islands of California
