= Tyler Island (California) =

Island in California

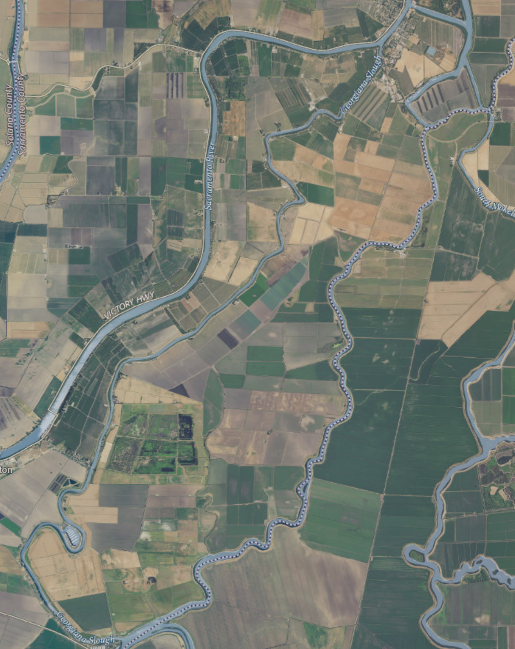
- USGS aerial imagery of the island.

- Location within Sacramento-San Joaquin River Delta Location within California Location within the United States

Geography
- Location: Northern California
- Coordinates: 38.1729725°N 121.5474531°W
- Adjacent to: Sacramento–San Joaquin River Delta

Administration
- United States
- State: California
- County: Sacramento

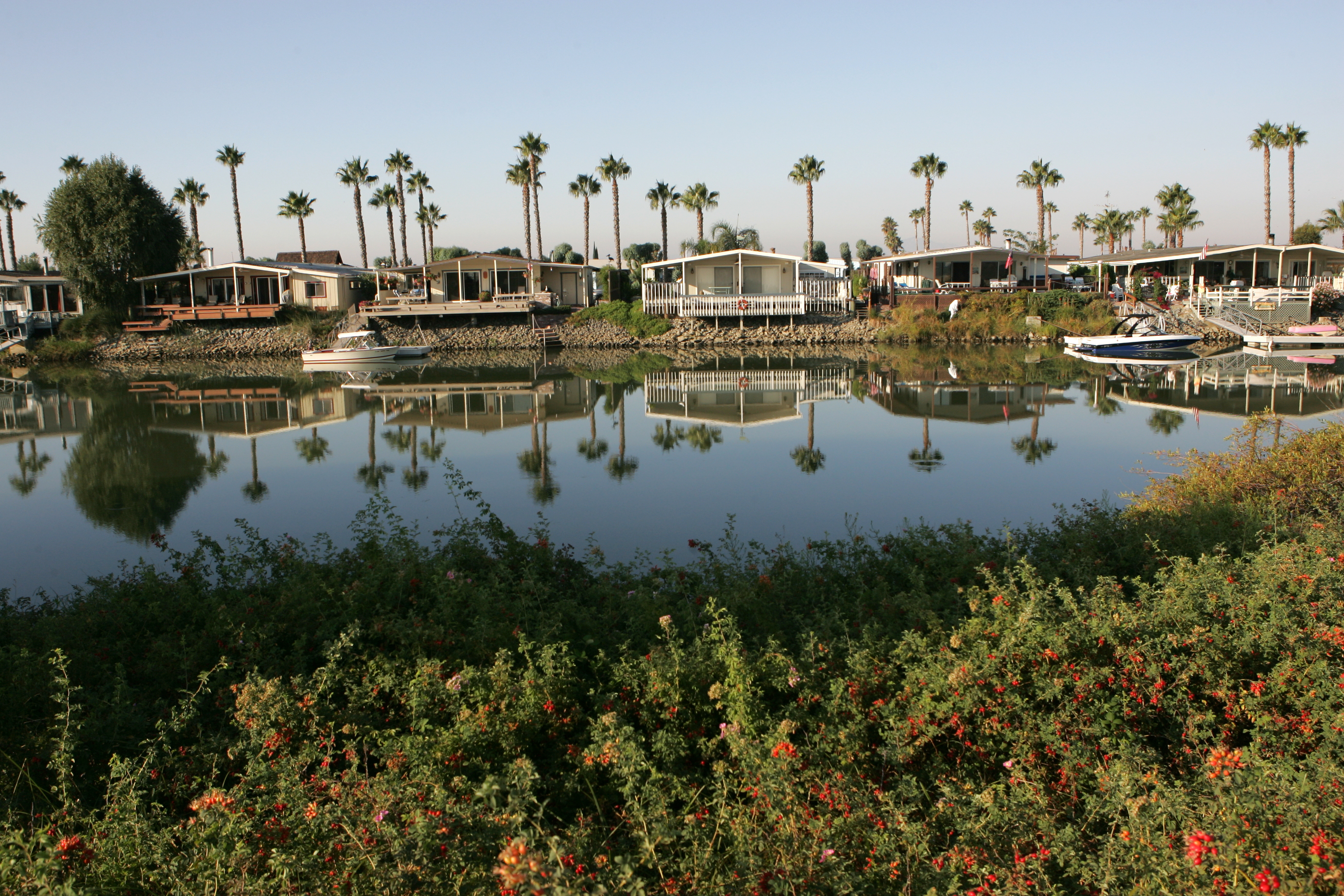
Houses on Tyler Island in 2006

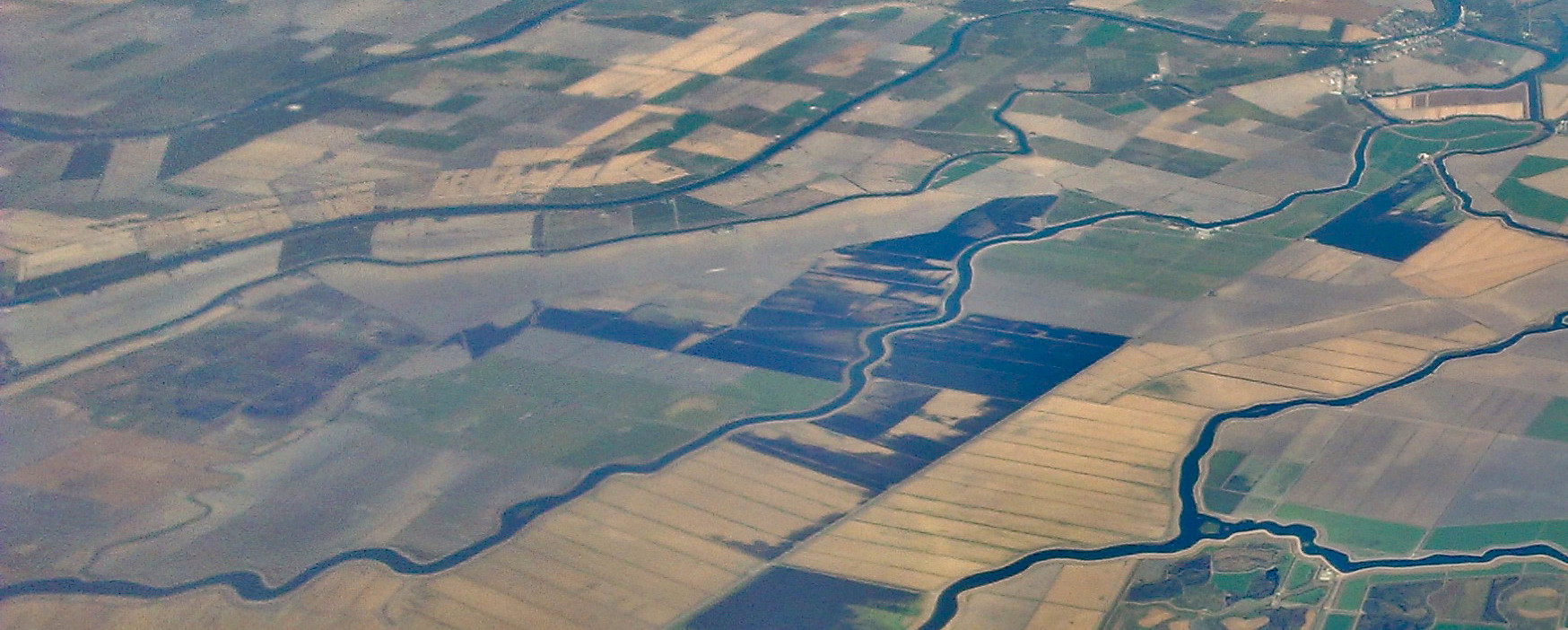
Tyler Island, seen from the southeast in a 2015 aerial photo. To its south is Staten Island, and to its north is Andrus Island.

Tyler Island is a small island in the San Joaquin River delta, part of Sacramento County, California, United States. Its coordinates are 38.1729725°N 121.5474531°W. It is named after 1861 owner W.C. Tyler, and managed by Reclamation Districts 563 and 554.
