= Domingo Marcucci =

- Born: 28 April 1827; Maracaibo, Venezuela
- Died: San Francisco, California, U.S.
- Resting place: San Francisco Columbarium
- Occupations: Shipbuilder, shipowner, 49er
- Known for: Building and owning steamships and sailing ships in San Francisco and Pacific Coast

Domingo Marcucci Jugo (Maracaibo, 1827 - San Francisco, 1905) was a Venezuelan born 49er, shipbuilder and shipowner in San Francisco, California. He owned or captained some of the many steamships, steamboats, ferries, and sailing ships he built at San Francisco and elsewhere on the Pacific coast.

== Early life and education ==
Domingo Marcucci was born in Maracaibo (Venezuela) on April 28, 1827, to Juan Bautista Marcucci, a native of Santiago de los Caballeros (Dominican Republic), and Catalina Jugo, a native of Caracas (Venezuela). He came to Philadelphia in the 1840s to study American shipbuilding techniques at the behest of the Venezuelan government. He worked as an apprentice in the shipyard of Mathew Van Duzen, the Byerly and Van Dusen Shipyard in Philadelphia.

== Shipbuilding in California ==
At the age of 22, Domingo Marcucci came to start a shipyard in San Francisco from Philadelphia. He came from Panama in the Pacific Mail Steamship Company steamship SS Oregon. Arriving on September 18, 1849, within days they began assembling a knock-down steamboat, previously delivered, on the beach of Yerba Buena Cove at Happy Valley, at the foot of Folsom Street, east of Beale Street. Marcucci's company assembled the Captain Sutter in six weeks. Built for George W. Aspinwall, brother of William Henry Aspinwall, it was the first steamboat that ran between San Francisco and Stockton, in 1849. Also for the Pacific Mail, Marcucci next converted the 153 ton side-wheel steamboat El Dorado that had been rigged as a 3 masted schooner for the trip around Cape Horn, to be used for the Sacramento run. Subsequently, in March 1850, for the same company, he assembled the Georgiana, a small 30 ton side-wheel steamboat made in Philadelphia, knocked down and sent by sea also for the Sacramento run. That April Georgiana pioneered the shortcut route between Sacramento and Stockton through a slough in the Sacramento–San Joaquin River Delta that was between the Sacramento River and Mokelumne River, which afterward became known as Georgiana Slough.

In the 1858, Marcucci moved to a shipyard at Steamboat Point, around Fourth and King Streets on Mission Bay. Here he built the side-wheel steamboat Flora Templeton in 1859, the barkentine Monitor in 1861, the side-wheel steamer Cyrus Walker for the Puget Sound in 1864 and the propeller steamer Reliance for the Alviso Transportation Company in 1866.

From 1866 to 1869, using Henry B. Tichenor’s Second Street marine railway, Marcucci built the stern-wheeler Pioneer, the twin screw propeller steamer Santa Cruz in 1868 and the large propeller steamer Vallejo for the California Pacific Railroad Company in 1869.

== Later life ==
Marcucci was appointed assistant inspector of steam vessels for the port of San Francisco, by the Treasury Department, in December, 1890. On September 2, 1893, he was struck on the head by a falling timber while inspecting the railroad ferry Thoroughfare in Oakland, California. He survived a fractured skull, recovered and continued to work. He resigned the position in January 1900 and retired. Domingo Marcucci died in 1905, and was buried in the San Francisco Columbarium.

== See also ==
- List of Venezuelan Americans
