= Georgiana Slough =

Georgiana Slough, is a slough within Sacramento County, California. It is located in the Sacramento–San Joaquin River Delta, and links both the Sacramento River and the San Joaquin River above their confluence in the Delta near Pittsburg, at the head of Suisun Bay, through its connection with the Mokelumne River. The entrance to the slough on the Sacramento River is just below Walnut Grove, at 38°14′21″N 121°30′59″W and runs between Tyler Island and Andrus Island to where it has its confluence with the Mokelumne River at 38°07′49″N 121°34′40″W northwest of Bouldin Island just above that rivers confluence with the San Joaquin River.

== History ==
Georgiana Slough was first used by steamboats in the 19th century as a shortcut between Sacramento and Stockton. It is named after the Georgiana, the first steamboat to use the route in April 1850.,
