= Staten Island (California) =

Island in San Joaquin County, California, United States

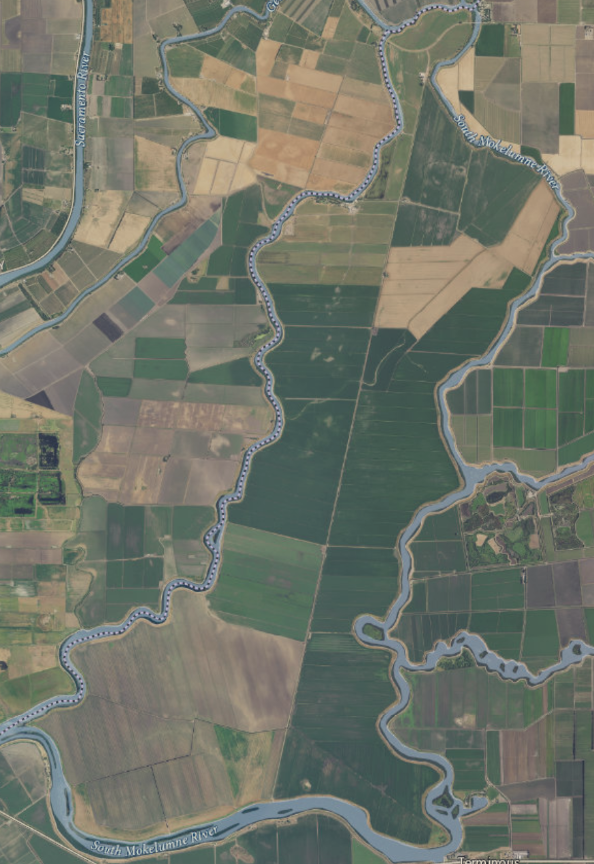
- USGS aerial imagery of the island.

- Location within Sacramento-San Joaquin River Delta Location within California Location within the United States

Geography
- Location: Northern California
- Coordinates: 38.164362°N 121.516342°W
- Adjacent to: Sacramento-San Joaquin River Delta
- Area: 9,100 acres (3,700 ha)

Administration
- United States
- State: California
- County: San Joaquin

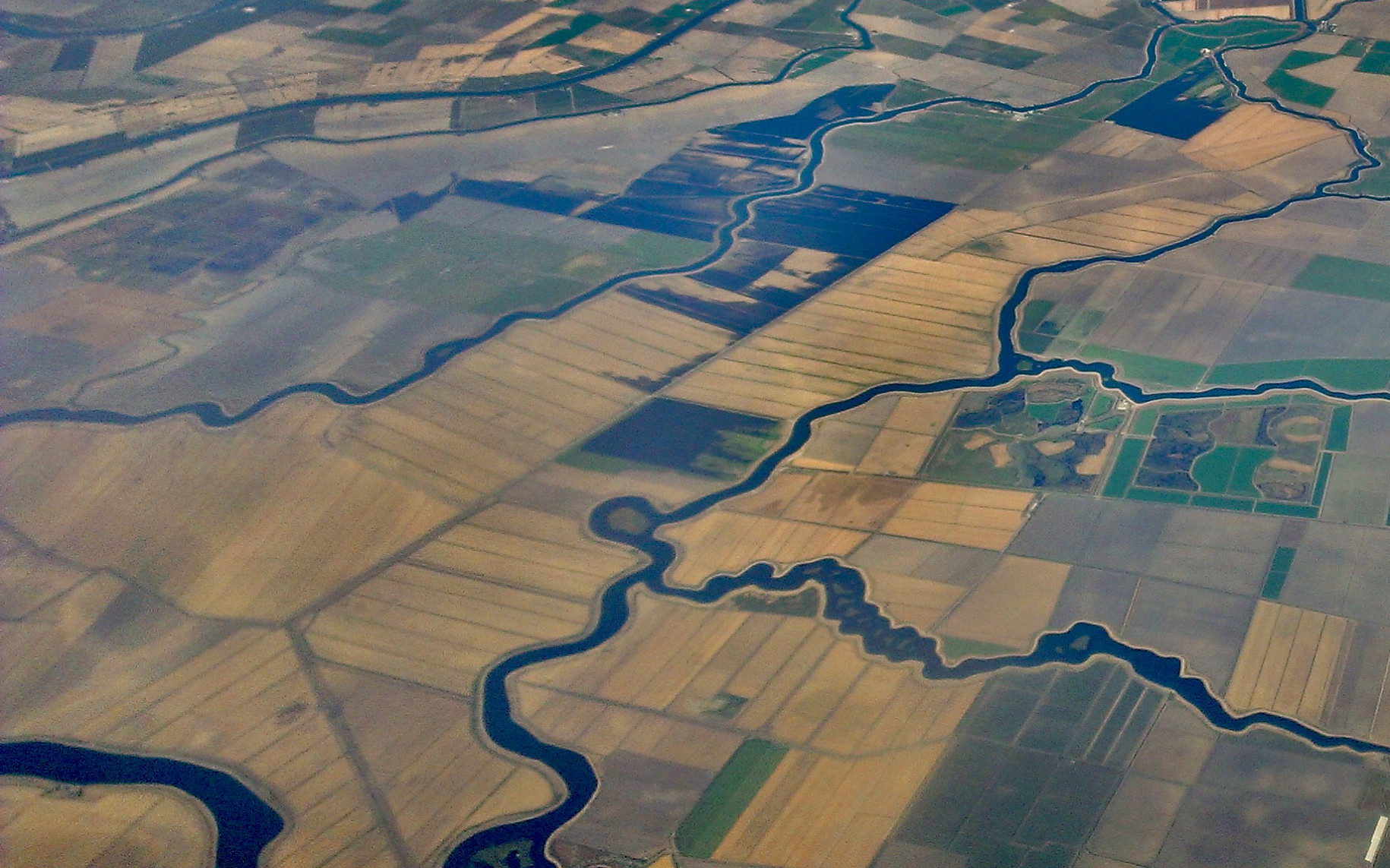
Staten Island in an aerial photo taken from the southeast in 2015. To its northwest are (in order) Tyler Island, Andrus Island and Grand Island.

Staten Island is an island in the Sacramento-San Joaquin River Delta, twenty-five kilometres northwest of Stockton. The 3,700 ha (9,100 acres) is bordered on the east and south by South Mokelumne River, and on the west and north by North Mokelumne River. It is in San Joaquin County, and managed by Reclamation District 38.

The island is privately owned by the Nature Conservancy. It is a popular stopping point for migratory sandhill cranes.

== See also ==
- List of islands of California
