= Georgiana (side-wheeler) =

1849 steamboat

Georgiana, a small side-wheel steamboat made in Philadelphia in 1849, one of the first on the waters of the Mokelumne River, Sacramento, San Joaquin and Tuolumne Rivers of California.

== Construction ==
The Georgiana was a 30-ton steamboat, built for the Aspinwall Steam Transportation Line in Philadelphia, knocked down and sent by sea to San Francisco in 1849. It was to be reassembled at the shipyard of Domingo Marcucci on the beach on San Francisco Bay just south of Folsom Street and east of Beale Street. Her keel was laid on February 22, 1850. She was 73 feet long, with a 16 feet beam and a 4.5-foot-deep hold and had machinery was put in by George K. Gluyas. Marcucci launched her with steam up and she began her trial run immediately.

== History ==
Shortly after it was launched, in April 1850, Georgiana pioneered the shortcut route through the Delta between Sacramento and Stockton, through, the slough, which connects the Sacramento River with the San Joaquin River through the Mokelumne River. The route was named the Georgiana Slough after the steamboat.

In May 1850, the Georgiana pioneered the route from Stockton up the San Joaquin River and Tuolumne River to Tuolumne City. Subsequently, her captain began a weekly service from Stockton to San Joaquin City Grayson City and Tuolumne City timed to leave after the arrival of the Captain Sutter from San Francisco. Following a dry summer, the low water in the river grounded the Georgiana ending the ambitions of Tuolumne City to be a river port until the 1860s. With overwhelming competition by the larger steamers of Simmons, Hutchinson & Company and the flood of other steamboats arriving from the East causing a decline in fares, in the fall of 1851 Aspenwall sold out. Georgiana was sold and by June 1851 was steaming between San Francisco and Sonoma, 3 times a week for Engels, Hooper and Company.

== Fate ==
The Georgiana's boiler blew up as it was departing Petaluma, and scalded 3, with loss of life on November 23, 1855.
