= SS Ismailia =

British cargo and passenger ship

History

United Kingdom
- Name: Ismailia
- Operator: Anchor Line
- Port of registry: Glasgow
- Builder: Robert Duncan & Co., Port Glasgow
- Yard number: 55
- Launched: 30 June 1870
- Fate: Disappeared after October 1873

General characteristics
- Type: Cargo/passenger steamship
- Tonnage: 1,630 GRT; 1,056 NRT
- Length: 300 ft 6 in (91.59 m)
- Beam: 33 ft 2 in (10.11 m)
- Depth: 29 ft 4 in (8.94 m)
- Propulsion: 1 × 424 nhp steam engine

SS Ismailia was a British cargo and passenger ship of the Anchor Line that disappeared in the Atlantic Ocean in 1873.

== Ship history ==
The ship was built by the Robert Duncan & Co. shipyard in Port Glasgow, and launched on 30 June 1870.

She sailed from New York City on 30 September 1873 carrying wheat and general cargo, with 52 people (44 crew and 8 passengers) aboard, en route for Glasgow. She was seen on 2 October, but then disappeared, and was never seen again.
