= Watson's Ferry, California =

Watson's Ferry
- Former settlement
- Location in California
- Coordinates: 36°46′10″N 120°21′45″W
- Country: United States
- State: California
- County: Fresno
- Elevation: 160 ft (49 m)

Watson's Ferry was a former settlement, river ferry and steamboat landing on Fresno Slough near its confluence with the San Joaquin River nearby to the northeast of modern Mendota in what is now Fresno County, California, United States. Watson's Ferry was located eight miles southeast of Firebaugh.

== History ==
Watson's Ferry was the head of steamboat navigation on Fresno Slough, 248 miles up the San Joaquin River from Stockton from the late 1860s to the early 1900s, when irrigation deprived Fresno Slough and the San Joaquin River of water to the point that it closed the upper river to navigation. It was an important crossing, connecting the western side of Fresno County to the county seat to the east. It became a center for sheep shearing, handling up to 200,000 sheep a year. Wool from this operation was shipped by steamer to San Francisco. After the construction of Whites Bridge two miles up the Fresno Slough, Whites Bridge became the new head of navigation.
