= Lizzie Throop =

Two-masted wooden schooner in the Great Lakes service

History
- Name: Lizzie Throop
- Builder: J. O'Connor of Mill Point, Michigan, United States
- Laid down: 1849
- Launched: 1849
- Out of service: October 18, 1873
- Fate: Foundered and sunk during a storm on October 18, 1873 in Lake Michigan.

General characteristics
- Class & type: Schooner
- Tonnage: 97 at time of sinking
- Length: 86 ft (26 m)
- Beam: 21 ft (6.4 m)
- Decks: 1
- Propulsion: Sail
- Crew: 8

The Lizzy Throop was a two-masted wooden schooner, that transported general goods and later, timbers across the Great Lakes from 1849 until 1873, when she broke up in a gale on October 17, 1873. The wrecked hull of the Lizzie Throop was discovered in the summer of 2016, while searching for the lost airliner Northwest Airlines Flight 2501.

== Vessel ==
Built by J. O'Conner, in what was previously known as Mill Point, Michigan, the wooden vessel was crafted out of timbers milled from one of Grand Haven's earliest saw mills. The single deck schooner was constructed to a length of 86 feet (26 meters), a breadth of 21 feet (6.4 meters), with a depth of 8 feet (2.4 meters). She displaced 123 tons. The vessel had an almost 4:1 ratio in length and width, giving the ship an unusual wide appearance. She could be operated by a crew of 6 to 8 men. The ship's namesake comes from a derivative of the ship owner, Nathan Throop's deceased wife, Caroline Elizabeth Throop.

== History on the Great Lakes ==
The Lizzie Throop encountered some misfortunes on the lakes in her quarter century on the lakes. Two grounding events occurred in 1854. According to insurance claims, in April, 1854, she was driven against breakwater, near Chicago, Illinois. She ran aground again that same year, in November. In 1865, her tonnage was reduced to 97 tons and her cargo hold was outfitted to carry timbers, logged from Northern Michigan. Towards the end of her life, she ran regular routes from Muskegon to Chicago, carrying timbers to the rebuilding metropolis of the Midwest that was recovering from the Great Chicago Fire.

== Loss ==
On October 16, 1873, the Throop left Muskegon with a load of wood slabs at dusk. Around 11 P.M. she was encountered by a squall. At 3am her hull sprang a leak and started taking on water. The surviving first mate recounted his story "At 1pm, she filled with water up to her decks. At this time we were away from land about fifteen miles. At half past 6pm, she rolled over. The men took to the rigging except the mate, who steered her until she rolled over. Three of the men got into the boat, the Captain and cook having before this washed off and drowned. The three men, including the mate, left the boat and got into the hull and made a line fast to the boat and let her hang to the hull. The vessel began to break up and the three men were washed off of her. One was drowned, and the other two got ashore on a piece of the wreck."

The Lizzie Throop's deck separated from the hull, due to the buoyancy force of the wood slabs in the cargo hold, and the ship taking on water and beginning to sink. The wood slabs pushed up through the strained decking, sending the hull to the bottom of Lake Michigan. What remained of the decking washed ashore hours later, nearly nine miles north of Grand Haven, with 4 of the sailors aboard. Two sailors, being Captain Mcmara and the cook, went down with the Throop.

== Discovery of the wreck ==
SideScan sonar expert Ralph Wilbanks, working with Michigan Shipwreck Research Associates, on behalf of Clive Cussler, while searching for a missing airliner that disappeared in 1950, was using side-scan sonar, when an image appeared of what looked like an early wooden sailing ship. The Throop was always believed to have all washed ashore, but the MSRA team discovered by studying the wreck's dimensions, that the image was indeed the hull of the Lizzie Throop. The Wreck lies in 280 feet (85 meters) of water, 15 miles (24 kilometers) northwest of South Haven. Wilbanks and his team also were responsible in locating the H.L. Hunley Confederate submarine.
