= Steamboat Point =

Headland marking of San Francisco Bay

Coordinates: 37.778°N 122.389°W

Steamboat Point a headland marking the northeastern limit of Mission Bay, on San Francisco Bay. It was named for the shipyards that built and repaired steamboats there during the 1850s to the mid 1860s.

== History ==
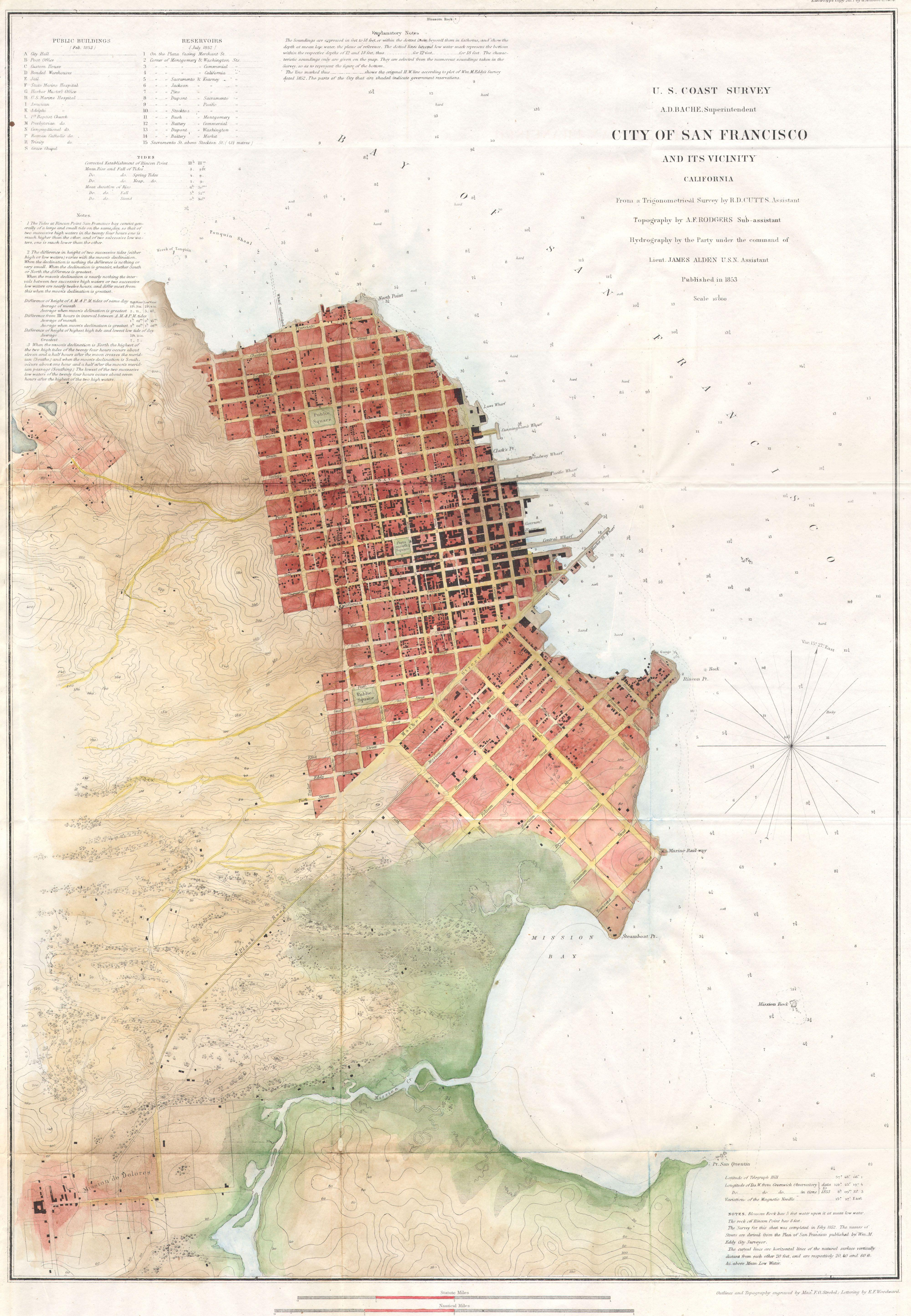
The Shoreline of San Francisco in 1853.

The first reference to Steamboat Point appeared on the 1852 U.S. Coast Survey Map of San Francisco, southeast of Third and Townsend Streets. H.B. Tichenor's marine railway at his shipyard for repairing ships, (the first on the Pacific coast), was shown at Second and Townsend, jutting into the bay. On the stretch of South Beach between Tichenor's railway and into the marsh just west of the point were located the boatyards of famed steamboat builders John G. North, Domingo Marcucci, Patrick H. Tiernan and others who constructed and repaired many and most of the best of the fleet of sternwheel and sidewheel steamboats and ferries that plied the bays and rivers of California, Oregon and Washington Territory. It was also the city's prime shipbuilding location until the mid-1860s, when the shipyards gradually moved south across the Mission Bay to Point San Quentin (or Potrero Point). Subsequently, the shore line along the bay was rapidly filled in leaving only a ship channel for Mission Creek and Steamboat Point a small hill inland from San Francisco Bay.
