= Pioneer (sidewheeler) =

Steamboat

Pioneer one of the first steamboats in California, after the Sitka in 1847, was a sidewheel steamboat equipped with an engine and boiler brought out in pieces from Boston on the 800-ton Edward Everett, and put together at the West Point, at Benicia.

The Edward Everett owned by The Boston and California Mining and Trading Joint Stock Company or "Edward Everett Company" arrived at Benicia on July 10, and while most of the members of the company went off to mine gold on the Mokelumne River, the best mechanics in the company were left behind at Benicia to build and launch the steamer. The keel was laid by the 13th of July, and on the 12th of August Pioneer was launched and brought alongside the ship. Her boiler and machinery were then lowered into her from the ship and secured in place. On the 15th a trial run was successfully made. Although considered by the company to be too slow, she was loaded for a voyage up to Sacramento, starting on the 17th of August, 1849. The first officer of the Edward Everett, William V. Wells was in command, Alfred N. Proctor as engineer and S. P. Barker as assistant.

When she arrived at Sacramento on the early morning of 19 August 1849:

"The steam whistle was sounded on approaching, and the whole camp was soon assembled upon the river bank to receive us and witness the unique sight of a steamboat on the Sacramento. Such a greeting has seldom been witnessed. The blasts of the whistle and the yelling of the multitude ushered in a day of jollification, in which whisky was the fuel that kept up steam on shore long after the fires had gone out under the boilers of the little Pioneer."

Pioneer was intended to run on the Sacramento River, and was a side-wheeler, 70 feet in length, 25-feet beam, with an eight-horse power engine that made "4 knots an hour, against wind and tide" and would normally carry forty passengers in her cabin and on her decks. In September, she made one trip to Sacramento and back, then was sold to Simmons, Hutchinson & Company for $6,000, for service between Sacramento and the Yuba River. Pioneer soon after met its end, holed by a snag and sunk on the Feather River.
