= Andrus Island =

Island in the United States of America

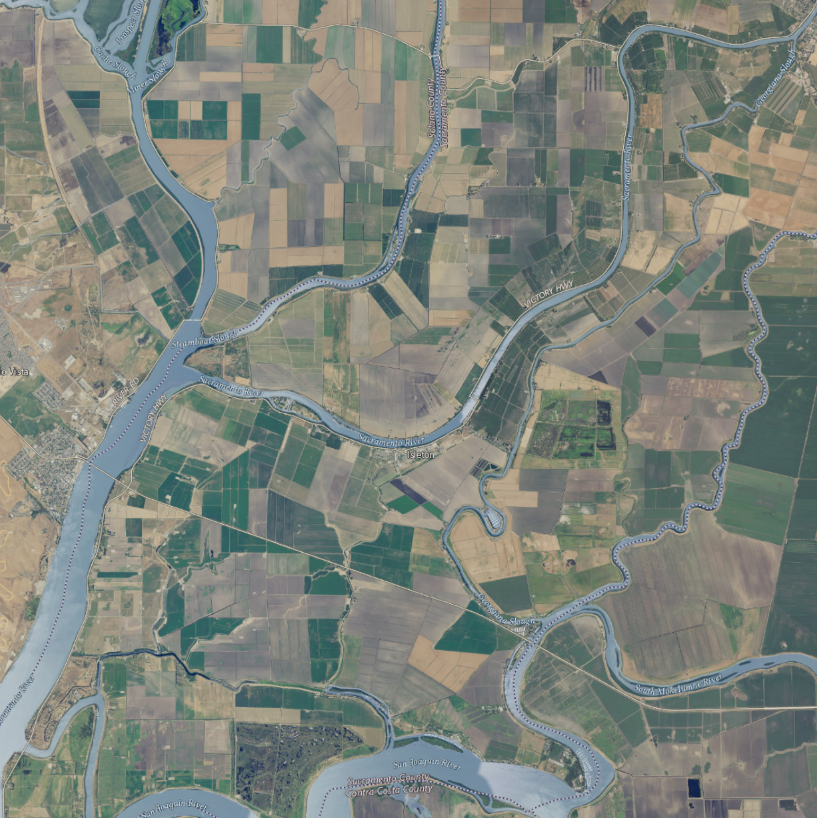
- USGS aerial imagery of the island.

- Location within Sacramento-San Joaquin River Delta Location within San Francisco Bay Area Location within California Location within the United States

Geography
- Location: Northern California
- Coordinates: 38.157695°N 121.598287°W
- Adjacent to: San Joaquin River

Administration
- United States
- State: California
- County: Sacramento

Andrus Island is an island in the Sacramento-San Joaquin River Delta in Sacramento County, California, twenty kilometres northeast of Antioch. The 3,000-hectare (7,400-acre) island is bounded on the north, and northwest by the Sacramento River, on the east, Georgiana Slough, on the southeast, Mokelumne River, and San Joaquin River, on the southwest Jackson Slough, and Seven Mile Slough. The island is entirely within the bounds of the immense Rio Vista Gas Field, although well drilling pads and associated infrastructure make up only a small part of its land use, which is mainly agriculture. It is managed by Reclamation Districts 556, 407 and 317.

The city of Isleton is on Andrus Island.

== See also ==
- List of islands of California
