= Tuolumne City, Stanislaus County, California =

Former settlement in California, United States

Coordinates: 37°36′15″N 121°07′52″W

Tuolumne City is a former settlement on the Tuolumne River, originally in Tuolumne County, during the California Gold Rush. The site has been in Stanislaus County since 1854, when it was formed from the western part of the old Tuolumne County.

== History ==
Tuolumne City was intended as a river port on the Tuolumne River for steamboats after the steamboat Georgiana pioneered a route up the San Joaquin River and Tuolumne River to it in May 1850. It was mostly abandoned after the low water of that summer grounded the Georgiana there, and river traffic failed to come again.

From the 1860s to 1871 the town revived when more shallow draft steamboats were used on the Tuolumne River. Steamers on the river were discontinued in 1871, and most of the buildings of the town were moved a few miles east to Modesto. Evidence of the town at the town site is not visible.
