= Grayson, California =

- unincorporated community census-designated place
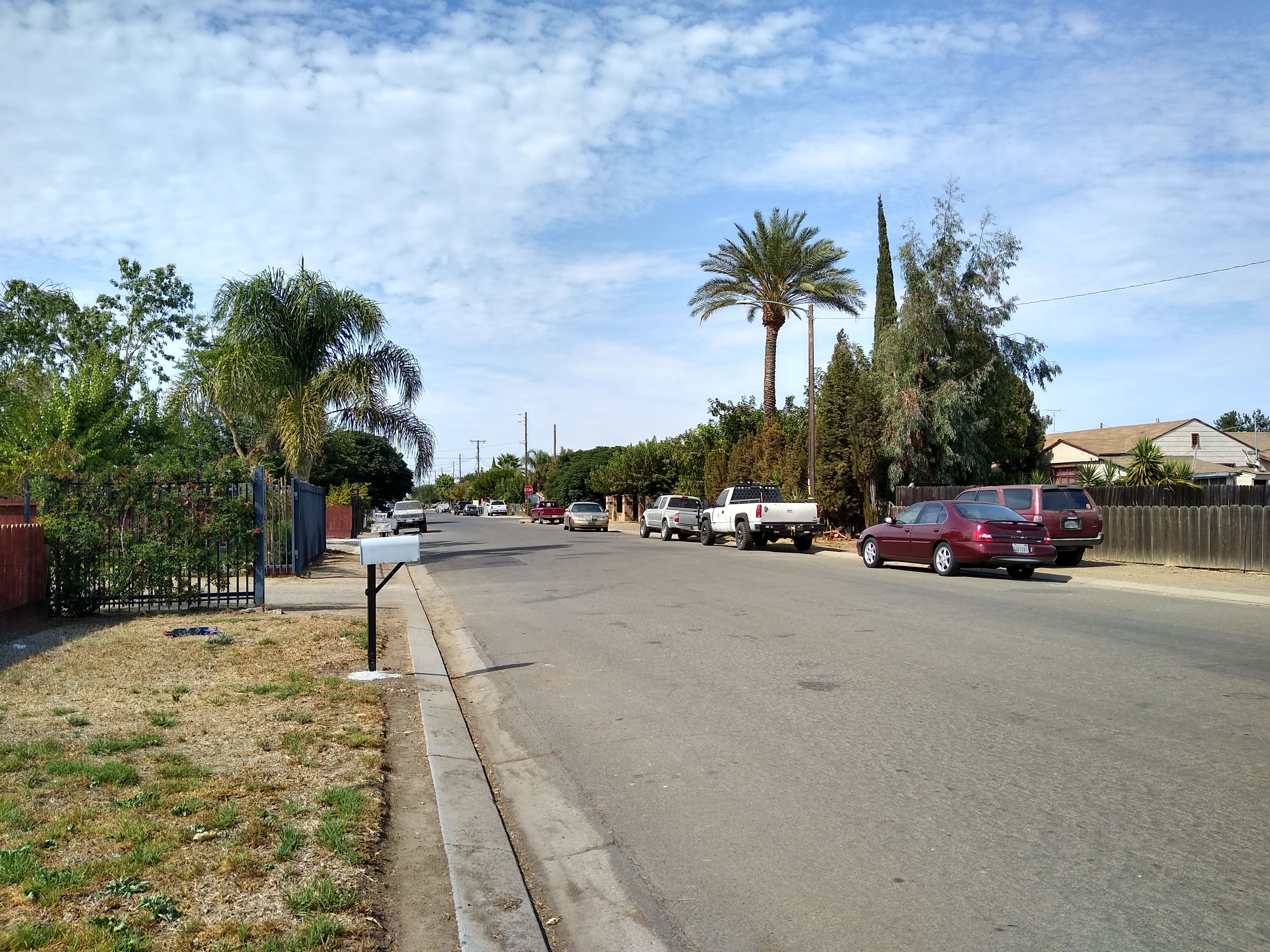

- Location in Stanislaus County and the state of California
- Coordinates: 37°33′53″N 121°10′51″W
- Country: United States
- State: California
- County: Stanislaus

Area
  - Total: 0.184 sq mi (0.477 km^{2})
  - Land: 0.184 sq mi (0.477 km^{2})
  - Water: 0 sq mi (0 km^{2}) 0%
- Elevation: 52 ft (16 m)

Population (2020)
  - Total: 1,041
  - Density: 5,650/sq mi (2,180/km^{2})
- Time zone: UTC-8 (Pacific (PST))
  - Summer (DST): UTC-7 (PDT)
- ZIP code: 95363
- Area code: 209
- FIPS code: 06-30882
- GNIS feature ID: 1658661

Grayson is an unincorporated community in Stanislaus County, California, United States. The population was 1,041 at the 2020 census, up from 952 at the 2010 census. For statistical purposes, the United States Census Bureau has defined Grayson as a census-designated place (CDP). It is part of the Modesto Metropolitan Statistical Area.

== History ==
Grayson or Graysonville, or Grayson City was founded by a company of seven men, which included Andrew Jackson Grayson (1818–1869). Grayson, a native of Louisiana, brought his family to California in 1846, and was active in the Mexican–American War. He was a self-taught watercolor painter and an authority of Pacific Coast birds.

Graysonville was a steamboat landing on the San Joaquin River from the time of the California Gold Rush until river traffic ended as the water was taken for agriculture. In 2019 Grayson became home to No Dice car club.

== Geography ==
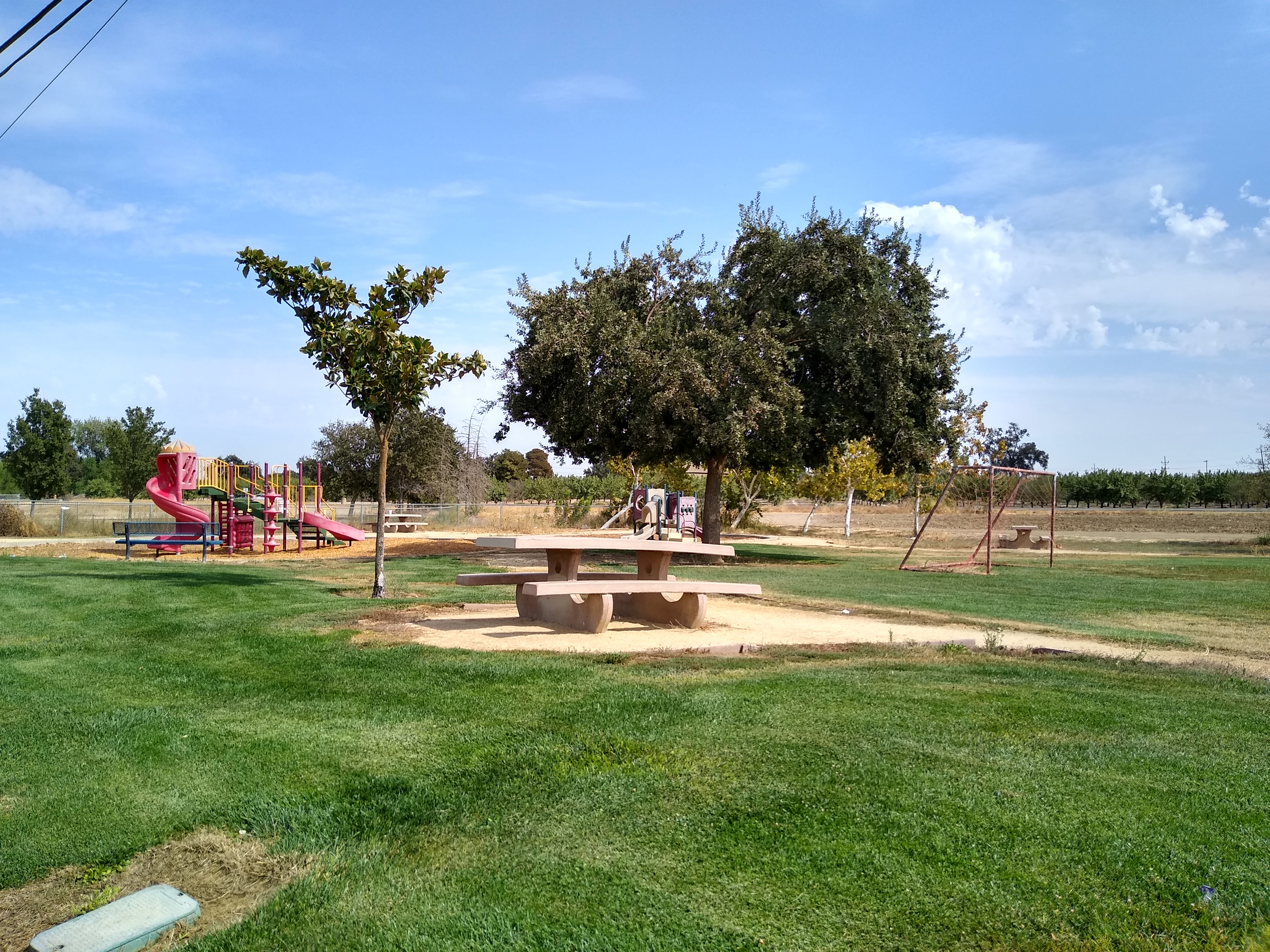
Grayson United Community Park

According to the United States Census Bureau, the CDP has a total area of 0.18 square miles (0.47 km^{2}), all land. The community lies at the convergence of the San Joaquin and Tuolumne rivers.

== Demographics ==
Historical population
Census	Pop.	Note	%±
2000	1,077		—
2010	952		−11.6%
2020	1,041		9.3%
U.S. Decennial Census; 1860–1870 1880-1890; 1900 1910 1920; 1930 1940 1950; 1960 1970 1980; 1990 2000 2010

Grayson first appeared as a census designated place in the 2000 U.S. census.

=== 2020 census ===
As of the 2020 census, Grayson had a population of 1,041 and a population density of 5,657.6 inhabitants per square mile (2,184.4/km^{2}). The median age was 33.4 years. The age distribution was 310 people (29.8%) under the age of 18, 120 people (11.5%) aged 18 to 24, 269 people (25.8%) aged 25 to 44, 258 people (24.8%) aged 45 to 64, and 84 people (8.1%) who were 65 years of age or older. For every 100 females, there were 103.3 males, and for every 100 females age 18 and over there were 101.9 males age 18 and over.

The whole population lived in households. There were 267 households, of which 129 (48.3%) had children under the age of 18 living in them. Of all households, 164 (61.4%) were married-couple households, 16 (6.0%) were cohabiting couple households, 39 (14.6%) were households with a male householder and no spouse or partner present, and 48 (18.0%) were households with a female householder and no spouse or partner present. About 35 households (13.1%) were made up of individuals and 11 (4.1%) had someone living alone who was 65 years of age or older. The average household size was 3.9, and there were 224 families (83.9% of all households).

There were 284 housing units at an average density of 1,543.5 units per square mile (595.9 units/km^{2}), of which 267 (94.0%) were occupied. Of occupied housing units, 161 (60.3%) were owner-occupied and 106 (39.7%) were occupied by renters. There were 17 vacant housing units (6.0%); the homeowner vacancy rate was 1.8% and the rental vacancy rate was 5.2%. 0.0% of residents lived in urban areas, while 100.0% lived in rural areas.

Racial composition as of the 2020 census
Race	Number	Percent
White	261	25.1%
Black or African American	22	2.1%
American Indian and Alaska Native	16	1.5%
Asian	7	0.7%
Native Hawaiian and Other Pacific Islander	1	0.1%
Some other race	550	52.8%
Two or more races	184	17.7%
Hispanic or Latino (of any race)	928	89.1%

=== 2010 census ===
The 2010 United States census reported that Grayson had a population of 952. The population density was 373.5 inhabitants per square mile (144.2/km^{2}). The racial makeup of Grayson was 455 (47.8%) White, 17 (1.8%) African American, 4 (0.4%) Native American, 3 (0.3%) Asian, 0 (0.0%) Pacific Islander, 417 (43.8%) from other races, and 56 (5.9%) from two or more races. Hispanic or Latino of any race were 819 persons (86.0%).

The Census reported that 952 people (100% of the population) lived in households, 0 (0%) lived in non-institutionalized group quarters, and 0 (0%) were institutionalized.

There were 250 households, out of which 143 (57.2%) had children under the age of 18 living in them, 154 (61.6%) were opposite-sex married couples living together, 38 (15.2%) had a female householder with no husband present, 25 (10.0%) had a male householder with no wife present. There were 18 (7.2%) unmarried opposite-sex partnerships, and 0 (0%) same-sex married couples or partnerships. 22 households (8.8%) were made up of individuals, and 6 (2.4%) had someone living alone who was 65 years of age or older. The average household size was 3.81. There were 217 families (86.8% of all households); the average family size was 4.03.

The population was spread out, with 318 people (33.4%) under the age of 18, 104 people (10.9%) aged 18 to 24, 260 people (27.3%) aged 25 to 44, 204 people (21.4%) aged 45 to 64, and 66 people (6.9%) who were 65 years of age or older. The median age was 29.0 years. For every 100 females, there were 114.4 males. For every 100 females age 18 and over, there were 108.6 males.

There were 280 housing units at an average density of 109.9 per square mile (42.4/km^{2}), of which 161 (64.4%) were owner-occupied, and 89 (35.6%) were occupied by renters. The homeowner vacancy rate was 4.7%; the rental vacancy rate was 11.9%. 578 people (60.7% of the population) lived in owner-occupied housing units and 374 people (39.3%) lived in rental housing units.

== Government ==
In the California State Legislature, Grayson is in the 4th senatorial district, represented by Republican Marie Alvarado-Gil, and the 22nd Assembly district, represented by Republican Juan Alanis.

In the United States House of Representatives, Grayson is in California's 13th congressional district and is represented by Democrat Adam Gray.

== Water infrastructure ==
The groundwater is polluted by nitrates so it is treated by ion exchange before being used as drinking water.
