= List of shipwrecks in June 1873 =

The list of shipwrecks in June 1873 includes ships sunk, foundered, grounded, or otherwise lost during June 1873.

== 1 June ==
List of shipwrecks: 1 June 1873
Ship	State	Description
Monarch	United Kingdom	The barque was wrecked in St. Andrews Bay with the loss of seven of the sixteen people on board.
Patriot	United Kingdom	The smack was run into by the smack James (United Kingdom) and sank off the Dutch coast. Her six crew were rescued by James.

== 2 June ==
List of shipwrecks: 2 June 1873
Ship	State	Description
Bridesmaid	(United Kingdom of Great Britain and Ireland) Jersey	The ship was wrecked at Gouberville, Manche, France. She was on a voyage from Neath, Glamorgan to Trouville, Manche. She was later refloated and beached.

== 3 June ==
List of shipwrecks: 3 June 1873
Ship	State	Description
HMS Alacrity	Royal Navy	The schooner ran aground in Vita Bay, Fiji Islands. She was refloated.
Java	Netherlands	The troopship caught fire in the English Channel off the coast of Hampshire, United Kingdom. She was on a voyage from a Dutch port to Batavia, Netherlands East Indies.

== 4 June ==
List of shipwrecks: 4 June 1873
Ship	State	Description
Belvedere	United States	The fishing schooner was lost on Brenton’s Reef, near Newport, Rhode Island. Crew saved.
Pladda	United Kingdom	The steamship was driven ashore at Low Hauxley, Northumberland. She was on a voyage from Newcastle upon Tyne, Northumberland to Dundee, Forfarshire. She was refloated the next day with the assistance of a tug.
HMS Pygmy	Royal Navy	The paddle steamer ran aground in Southampton Water at Marchwood, Hampshire. The troops she was carrying were taken off in boats. She was on a voyage from Marchwood to Cowes, Isle of Wight.
Welsh Girl	United Kingdom	The ketch was run down and sunk off the coast of Pembrokeshire by the steamship John Brogden (United Kingdom). Her crew were rescued by John Brogden. Welsh Girl was on a voyage from Jersey, Channel Islands to Runcorn, Cheshire.

== 5 June ==
List of shipwrecks: 5 June 1873
Ship	State	Description
City of Pekin	United Kingdom	The full-rigged ship collided with a barque and foundered in the Atlantic Ocean. Her crew took to a boat; they were rescued on 7 June by Loch Earn (United Kingdom). City of Pekin was on a voyage from Rangoon, Burma to Liverpool, Lancashire.
Fox	United Kingdom	The steamship ran aground on rocks and was wrecked near Saint Ouen, Jersey, Channel Islands.
Khedive	United Kingdom	The steamship ran aground at Southampton, Hampshire. She was on a voyage from Southampton to Australia. She was later refloated.
Waverley	United Kingdom	The paddle steamer was wrecked in fog on the Platte Boue Rock, Little Roussel, Guernsey, Channel Islands. Her 65 passengers were landed on Grand Afroque, from where they were rescued by the steamship Brittany (United Kingdom). Waverley was on a voyage from Southampton, Hampshire to Guernsey. She broke her back the next day and was abandoned.

== 6 June ==
List of shipwrecks: 6 June 1873
Ship	State	Description
Alexander Marshall	United States	The ship ran aground on the Experiment Shoals. She was on a voyage form New York to Doboy Sound. She was refloated.
Anne Smith	United Kingdom	The steamship ran aground in the Scheldt. She was on a voyage from Antwerp, Belgium to Constantinople, Ottoman Empire.
Antoinette	Germany	The ship was driven ashore at Dungeness, Kent, United Kingdom. She was on a voyage from Hamburg to Guinea.
Eagle	United Kingdom	The ketch sprang a leak and sank off the South Stack Lighthouse, Anglesey. Her crew were rescued. She was on a voyage from Par, Cornwall to Runcorn, Cheshire.
Yarborough	United Kingdom	The steamship collided with the steamship Odessa (Russia) and sank in the North Sea with the loss of two of her crew. Yarborough was on a voyage from Great Yarmouth, Norfolk to Newcastle upon Tyne, Northumberland.
Unnamed	United Kingdom	The dandy-rigged vessel struck a sunken rock in Carnarvon Bay and sank with the loss of all hands.

== 7 June ==
List of shipwrecks: 7 June 1873
Ship	State	Description
Adelaide	(United Kingdom of Great Britain and Ireland) Guernsey	The brig was run into by the steamship Calypso (United Kingdom) and sank in the River Thames at Gravesend, Kent. Her crew were rescued. Adelaide was on a voyage from Guernsey, Channel Islands to South Shields, County Durham. She was later refloated and taken in to Grays Thurrock, Essex.
Biafra	United Kingdom	The brigantine ran aground on the Brake Sand. She was refloated with assistance.
Stornoway	United Kingdom	The clipper was wrecked on the Kentish Knock. Her crew were rescued. She was on a voyage from South Shields to Villaricos, Spain.

== 8 June ==
List of shipwrecks: 8 June 1873
Ship	State	Description
Martha	Germany	The barque was driven ashore in Dunnet Bay. Her crew were rescued. She was on a voyage from Philadelphia, Pennsylvania, United States to Königsberg. She subsequently broke up.
Otto and Frekta	Germany	The ship capsized and sank at Kahlberg. Her crew were rescued.

== 9 June ==
List of shipwrecks: 9 June 1873
Ship	State	Description
Forward Ho	New South Wales	The ship ran aground at Wusong, China. She was refloated on 11 June.
Verona	United Kingdom	The steamship ran aground in the Elbe off Freiburg, Germany. She was on a voyage from Leith, Lothian to Hamburg, Germany. She was refloated.

== 10 June ==
List of shipwrecks: 10 June 1873
Ship	State	Description
Advance	New Zealand	The 13-ton cutter was carried onto the spit at the mouth of the Waikouaiti River and became a wreck.
Biddick	United Kingdom	The steamship ran aground at Sunderland, County Durham. She was on a voyage from the Nieuwe Diep to Sunderland. She was refloated.
Cornish Girl	United Kingdom	The lugger sank after striking the Round Rock in the Spanish Ledges on the Isles of Scilly in fine weather. No lives lost.
Drydens	United Kingdom	The barque ran aground on the Blackhouse Island Shoal, off the coast of County Down. She was on a voyage from Philadelphia, Pennsylvania, United States to Newry, County Antrim. She was refloated the next day and towed in to Warrenpoint, County Down.
Hannah	United Kingdom	The brigantine was damaged by fire at Burry Port, Glamorgan. She was on a voyage from Llanelly, Glamorgan to Caen, Calvados, France.
Para	United Kingdom	The brig ran aground on the Domesnes Reef, in the Baltic Sea. She was refloated but was run ashore near Riga, Russia. Subsequently refloated and taken in to Bolderāja, Russia.
Fourteen unnamed vessels	United Kingdom	The fishing boats were wrecked at Stornoway, Isle of Lewis, Outer Hebrides.

== 11 June ==
List of shipwrecks: 11 June 1873
Ship	State	Description
Annie Francis	United Kingdom	The barque was abandoned in the Atlantic Ocean in a sinking condition. Her eleven crew were rescued by the full-rigged ship David. G. Fleming (United Kingdom). Annie Francis was on a voyage from Cardiff, Glamorgan to Rosario, Argentina.
James Ives	United States	The ship ran aground on the Lavender Shoal. She was on a voyage from Sagua La Grande, Cuba to Philadelphia, Pennsylvania.
Lady Proby	United Kingdom	The ship was abandoned off Saint Govan's Head, Pembrokeshire. Her crew were rescued by the steamship Sunlight (United Kingdom). Lady Proby was on a voyage from Saundersfoot, Pembrokeshire to Wexford.
Montrose	United Kingdom	The ship was abandoned in Simons Bay.

== 12 June ==
List of shipwrecks: 12 June 1873
Ship	State	Description
Emma Little	United Kingdom	The ship foundered in the English Channel off Cap Gris Nez, Pas-de-Calais, France. Her crew were rescued. She was on a voyage from Boulogne, Pas-de-Calais to London.
Fiery Cross	United Kingdom	The tug sank at Leith, Lothian. She was refloated the next day.

== 13 June ==
List of shipwrecks: 13 June 1873
Ship	State	Description
Charlotte	United Kingdom	The barque foundered in the Atlantic Ocean 400 nautical miles (740 km) west of Cape Clear Island, County Cork. Her crew were rescued by Rjukan (Flag unknown). Charlotte was on a voyage from Liverpool, Lancashire to Saint John, New Brunswick, Canada.
Esperia	United Kingdom	The ship was driven ashore and damaged at Boddam, Aberdeenshire. She was refloated and take in to Boddam.
Unnamed	United Kingdom	The fishing smack was run down 10 nautical miles (19 km) off the mouth of the River Tyne by the steamship Earl Percy (United Kingdom). Her six crew were rescued by the fishing boat Henrietta (United Kingdom). The smack was towed in to South Shields, County Durham in a damaged condition.

== 14 June ==
List of shipwrecks: 14 June 1873
Ship	State	Description
Amelie Hageman	France	The ship was run into by the steamship Berlin (Germany) west of the Eddystone Lighthouse, Cornwall, United Kingdom. Amelie Hageman was severely damaged and became waterlogged. She was on a voyage from Saint-Marc, Haiti to Havre de Grâce, Seine-Inférieure.
Elizabeth	United Kingdom	The ship ran aground and sank at Hellevoetsluis, Zeeland, Netherlands. Her crew were rescued. She was on a voyage from Newcastle upon Tyne, Northumberland to Rotterdam, South Holland, Netherlands.
Nigretia	United Kingdom	The steamship was wrecked on the Carpenter Rock, off the coast of Sierra Leone. All on board were rescued. She was on a voyage from Freetown, Sierra Leone to the Cape Coast Castle, Gold Coast.
Tirzah	United Kingdom	The ship ran aground "on Tamio", near Fredrikshavn, Denmark. She was refloated and resumed her voyage.

== 15 June ==
List of shipwrecks: 15 June 1873
Ship	State	Description
Gilmas	United States	The schooner foundered off Cape Cod, Massachusetts. Three crew were rescued by Julia (United Kingdom).
Guiding Star, Sirius, and Tynwald	United Kingdom; United Kingdom (United Kingdom of Great Britain and Ireland) Isle of Man	The steamships Sirius and Tynwald and the tug Guiding Star all collided in the Sloyne.
Hogton Tower	United Kingdom	The ship collided with HMS Caledonia Royal Navy off St. Alban's Head, Dorset and was severely damaged. Severely damaged at the bows, HMS Caledonia towed her in to Spithead, Hampshire.

== 16 June ==
List of shipwrecks: 16 June 1873
Ship	State	Description
Clarinda	United Kingdom	The steamship ran aground on the Goodwin Sands, Kent. She was on a voyage from Newport, Monmouthshire to Kronstadt, Russia. She was later refloated with assistance and towed in to the River Thames.
Sebastopol	United Kingdom	The barque ran aground at Palermo, Sicily, Italy. She was refloated.

== 17 June ==
List of shipwrecks: 17 June 1873
Ship	State	Description
Celine	United Kingdom	The ship ran aground on the Cockle Sand, in the North Sea off the coast of Norfolk. She was on a voyage from Hull, Yorkshire to "Petersen". She was refloated and taken in to Great Yarmouth, Norfolk in a leaky condition.
Eliza Alice	United Kingdom	The barque was destroyed by fire at Amsterdam, North Holland, Netherlands. She was on a voyage from Amsterdam to Buenos Aires, Argentina.
Shotton	United Kingdom	The steamship ran aground and sank on the Rullafruin, in the Baltic Sea off the coast of Sweden. She was on a voyage from Hartlepool, County Durham to Kronstadt, Russia. She was later refloated and towed in to Copenhagen, Denmark in a severely damaged condition.
Ville de Montpellier	France	The ship was driven ashore and wrecked at Alibag, India. She was on a voyage from Rangoon, Burma to Bombay, India.

== 18 June ==
List of shipwrecks: 18 June 1873
Ship	State	Description
Concordia	United Kingdom	The barque was wrecked at Cape Anguille, Newfoundland Colony with the loss of five of her seventeen crew. She was on a voyage from Quebec City, Canada to Plymouth, Devon.
Isle of Wight	United Kingdom	The East Indiaman was abandoned in the Indian Ocean. Her crew were rescued by Edith Tromp (Flag unknown). Isle of Wight was on a voyage from Rangoon, Burma to London.
London	United Kingdom	The schooner ran aground at Warrenpoint, County Antrim. She was on a voyage from Kilrush, County Clare to Newry, County Antrim. She was refloated and taken in to Warrenpoint.
Unnamed	United Kingdom	The steamship ran ashore at Flamborough Head, Yorkshire. She was refloated and resumed her voyage.

== 19 June ==
List of shipwrecks: 19 June 1873
Ship	State	Description
Adler	Germany	The schooner ran aground on the Calloat Bank, in the North Sea off the coast of Zeeland, Netherlands.
Alliance	Sweden	The brig was driven ashore on Skagen, Denmark. She was on a voyage from Hull, Yorkshire, United Kingdom to Söderhamn. She subsequently became a wreck.
Elizabeth	Norway	The ship was driven ashore on Skagen. She was on a voyage from Newcastle upon Tyne, Northumberland, United Kingdom to Copenhagen, Denmark. She subsequently became a wreck.
Mary	United Kingdom	The schooner was driven ashore near La Atunara, Spain. She was on a voyage from "Gioja", Spain to Hull. She was refloated.
Spring	United Kingdom	The barque was driven ashore in Robin Hoods Bay. She was on a voyage from Sunderland, County Durham to a Mediterranean port. She was refloated with assistance.

== 20 June ==
List of shipwrecks: 20 June 1873
Ship	State	Description
Marathon	United Kingdom	The steamship was damaged by fire at Stobcross, Renfrewshire.
Henrietta	United Kingdom	The brig departed from Ardrossan, Ayrshire for Barbados. No further trace, presumed foundered with the loss of all eleven crew.
Unnamed	Italy	The ship ran aground on the Goodwin Sands, Kent, United Kingdom. She was on a voyage from Havre de Grâce, Seine-Inférieure, France to Hull, Yorkshire, United Kingdom. She was refloated with assistance and resumed her voyage.

== 21 June ==
List of shipwrecks: 21 June 1873
Ship	State	Description
Annie Sherwood	United Kingdom	The ship was sunk by ice at "Sweetnote". Her crew were rescued. She was on a voyage from Maryport, Cumberland to Arkhangelsk, Russia.
Bokhara	United Kingdom	The steamship struck a sunken rock and was beached at Kowloon, China. She was refloated and taken in to Hong Kong for repairs.
Brestois	France	The steamship was wrecked at Camaret-sur-Mer, Finistère. All on board survived. She was on a voyage from Brest, Finistère to Bordeaux, Gironde.
Dilpussund	United Kingdom	The barque ran aground on the Saratoga Spit.
Duchess of Sutherland	United Kingdom	The steamship ran aground between North Stack and Soldier's Point, Anglesey. She was on a voyage from Dublin to Holyhead, Anglesey. She was refloated and put in to Holyhead, where she was run into by Cambria and severely damaged.
James	Denmark	The ship ran aground. She was on a voyage from Bollstabruk, Sweden to Weener, Germany. She was refloated and taken in to Stockholm, Sweden.
Ocean Drift	United Kingdom	The brig was driven ashore on Skagen, Denmark. She was on a voyage from Blyth, Northumberland to Kronstadt, Russia. She was refloated and taken in to Helsingør, Denmark.
St. Columba	United Kingdom	The paddle steamer was wrecked on The Skerries, off the coast of Anglesey with the loss of sixteen lives. About 200 survivors were rescued by the keepers of the Skerries Lighthouse. She was on a voyage from Dublin to Holyhead, Anglesey and Liverpool, Lancashire.
Verulam	United Kingdom	The barque ran aground in the Yangtze. She was later refloated and towed in to Shanghai, China.

== 22 June ==
List of shipwrecks: 22 June 1873
Ship	State	Description
Codrington	United Kingdom	The ship sprang a leak and was beached at Harburg, Germany. She was on a voyage from Hartlepool, County Durham to Stockholm, Sweden.
Glenalbyn	United Kingdom	The schooner was driven ashore in Ballycroneen Bay, County Cork. She was refloated and taken in to Queenstown, County Cork.
Kwara	United Kingdom	Third Ashanti War: The steamship ran aground at the mouth of the Brass River whilst going to the assistance of Monrovia (United Kingdom). She was attacked and destroyed by local inhabitants. Her crew were rescued.

== 23 June ==
List of shipwrecks: 23 June 1873
Ship	State	Description
Catherina	United Kingdom	The ship ran aground at Dragør, Denmark. She was on a voyage from Hartlepool, County Durham to Kronstadt, Russia. She was refloated and resumed her voyage.
Serafino	United States	The ship ran aground. She was on a voyage from Philadelphia, Pennsylvania to Dublin, United Kingdom. She was refloated and resumed her voyage.

== 24 June ==
List of shipwrecks: 24 June 1873
Ship	State	Description
Alcinous	France	The barque was run into by the steamship Hindostan (United Kingdom) and sank 15 nautical miles (28 km) off the coast of Ceylon. Her thirteen crew were rescued by Hindostan. Alcinous was on a voyage from Mauritius to Pondicherry, India.
Angelina	Guatemala	The barque was wrecked at Lebu, Chile.
Eliza	United Kingdom	The schooner was driven ashore and wrecked at Cranfield Point, County Down. She was on a voyage from Irvine, Ayrshire to Newry, County Antrim.
Jane	United Kingdom	The barque was wrecked at Tobago. Her crew were rescued. She was on a voyage from Tobago to London.
Louisa Jane	United Kingdom	The ship departed from Saundersfoot, Pembrokeshire for Kilrush, County Clare. No further trace, presumed foundered with the loss of all hands.
Manchester	United Kingdom	The brigantine ran aground on Taylor's Bank, in Liverpool Bay. Her crew were rescued by a gig and placed aboard the Formby Lightship ( Trinity House), from where they were rescued by the New Brighton Lifeboat. Manchester was refloated with the assistance of the tug Tiger (United Kingdom) and beached near Egremont, Lancashire.
Peter Graham	United Kingdom	The steamship ran aground on the Maplin Sand, in the North Sea off the coast of Essex. She was on a voyage from Northfleet, Kent to Newcastle upon Tyne, Northumberland.
Sisters	United Kingdom	The schooner was driven ashore and wrecked at Atherfield, Isle of Wight. Her crew were rescued. She was on a voyage from Massawa, Egypt.
Skulda	Norway	The ship became jammed between the dock entrance and the steamship Forth (United Kingdom) at Grangemouth, Stirlingshire, United Kingdom and was severely damaged.

== 25 June ==
List of shipwrecks: 25 June 1873
Ship	State	Description
Ellen	(United Kingdom of Great Britain and Ireland) Guernsey	The brigantine struck a sunken wreck and foundered in the North Sea 6 nautical miles (11 km) off Lowestoft, Suffolk. Her crew were rescued by a smack. She was on a voyage from Newcastle upon Tyne, Northumberland to Guernsey, or from Guernsey to South Shields, County Durham.
Entella	Nicaragua	The barque sank at Zapallar, Chile.
Florence	United Kingdom	The trow sank on the Gore Sands, in the Bristol Channel off the coast of Somerset with the loss of all four crew. She was on a voyage from Cardiff, Glamorgan to Bridgwater, Somerset.
Gilmas Dickson	United States	The schooner foundered off Cape Cod, Massachusetts. Her crew were rescued by Julia (Flag unknown).
Ida	United Kingdom	The ship ran aground at Liverpool, Lancashire. She was on a voyage from Ayr to Liverpool. She was refloated and taken in to Liverpool.
John Ellis	United Kingdom	The schooner ran aground at Ryde, Isle of Wight. She was on a voyage from Newcastle upon Tyne, Northumberland to a Mediterranean port.
Zephyr	France	The ship sprang a leak and foundered in the English Channel 20 nautical miles (37 km) off Barfleur, Manche Her crew were rescued by Harlequin (France). Zephyr was on a voyage from Barfleur to Portsmouth, Hampshire, United Kingdom.
Unnamed	Flag unknown	The brigantine foundered off Yarmouth, Isle of Wight. Her crew were rescued by a smack.

== 26 June ==
List of shipwrecks: 26 June 1873
Ship	State	Description
Emma	United Kingdom	The steamship ran aground at Ostend, West Flanders, Belgium. She was on a voyage from Sunderland, County Durham to Ostend.
Halia	United Kingdom	The ship ran aground off "Trepori", Italy.
Harmony	United Kingdom	The ship, a brigantine or a schooner, collided with the steamship Kelso (United Kingdom) and sank in the North Sea off the coast of Norfolk. Her six crew were rescued. She was on a voyage from Mazagan, Morocco to Boston, Lincolnshire.
Nina	United Kingdom	The ship ran aground and was severely damaged at Montrose, Forfarshire. She was on a voyage from Quebec City, Canada to Montrose. She was refloated and taken in to Montrose.
Tom Bell	United Kingdom	The steamship was driven ashore at Anga, Gotland, Sweden. She was on a voyage from Kronstadt, Russia to Rotterdam, South Holland, Netherlands.

== 27 June ==
List of shipwrecks: 27 June 1873
Ship	State	Description
Agathe	United Kingdom	The ship ran aground on the Pillars. She was on a voyage from Quebec City, Canada to Liverpool, Lancashire. She was refloated and resumed her voyage.
British Banner	United Kingdom	The ship ran aground on the Sunk Sand, in the North Sea off the coast of Essex. She was on a voyage from London to Newcastle upon Tyne, Northumberland. She was refloated and taken in to Harwich, Essex.
Derby	United Kingdom	The Mersey Flat was holed by the propeller of the steamship San Antonio (Flag unknown) and sank at Liverpool, Lancashire.
Henry Woolley	United Kingdom	The barque foundered in the North Sea. Her crew were rescued by the fishing vessel Charlotta Elise (Belgium). Henry Woolley was on a voyage from Grangemouth, Stirlingshire to Riga, Russia.

== 28 June ==
List of shipwrecks: 28 June 1873
Ship	State	Description
Express	Sweden	The steamship ran aground off Cap Arcona, Germany. She was on a voyage from Riga, Russia to Lübeck, Germany.
Willie	United Kingdom	The schooner ran aground in the River Mersey at Garston, Lancashire. She was on a voyage from Runcorn, Cheshire to Cette, Hérault, France. She had been refloated by 30 June and taken in to Liverpool, Lancashire for repairs.

== 29 June ==
List of shipwrecks: 29 June 1873
Ship	State	Description
Fede	Italy	The barque was run into by the steamship Pascal (United Kingdom) and sank in the English Channel off St. Catherine's Point, Isle of Wight, United Kingdom. Fede was on a voyage from Newcastle upon Tyne, Northumberland, United Kingdom to Alexandria, Egypt.
Mary Gray	United Kingdom	The steamship ran aground on the Arran Man's Barrels, off Sanda Island, in the Firth of Clyde. She was on a voyage from Glasgow, Renfrewshire to Strabane, County Donegal. Mary Gray was refloated, but had to be beached at Macharioch, Argyllshire.

== 30 June ==
List of shipwrecks: 30 June 1873
Ship	State	Description
Cornet	United Kingdom	The schooner was sunk by ice at Antwerp, Belgium. She was on a voyage from Vilvoorde, Flemish Brabant, Belgium to Liverpool, Lancashire.
Daisy	United Kingdom	The tug sank at Cardiff, Glamorgan.
Empire State	United States	The fishing schooner went ashore at Cape Porpoise, a total loss. Crew saved.
Kestrel, and an unnamed vessel	United Kingdom	The schooner Kestrel was run into by a steamship and sank in the River Avon. The steamship was beached.
Margaret	United Kingdom	The ship ran aground in the Gut of Canso. She was refloated and put in to Port Hawkesbury, Nova Scotia, Canada in a sinking condition and capsized there. Subsequently refloated and placed under repair.
Nil Desperandum	United Kingdom	The sloop was wrecked at Spittal Point, Northumberland with the loss of all hands.
Theresa and Julie	France	The barque was driven ashore on Barbuda. She was consequently condemned.

== Unknown date ==
List of shipwrecks: Unknown date in June 1873
Ship	State	Description
Alexa	United Kingdom	The ship ran aground and sank at Castlebay, Barra, Outer Hebrides. She was on a voyage from Castlebay to Saint Petersburg, Russia.
Aoa	United Kingdom	The ship foundered in the Atlantic Ocean 60 nautical miles (110 km) east of Pará, Brazil. Her crew were rescued. She was on a voyage from Liverpool, Lancashire to Pará.
Aptur	Ottoman Empire	The ship was wrecked near Karabournou Point. She was on a voyage from Narva, Russia to Trebizond.
Brenda	United Kingdom	The ship foundered in the English Channel off Beachy Head, Sussex.
Burgermeister Richard	Germany	The ship was driven ashore between Lowestoft and Southwold, Suffolk, United Kingdom. She was on a voyage from "Passenburg" to London, United Kingdom. She was later refloated.
Concordia	United Kingdom	The ship was wrecked at Cape Anguille, Newfoundland Colony before 20 June with some loss of life. She was on a voyage from Quebec City, Canada to Plymouth, Devon.
Culmore	United Kingdom	The steamship ran aground at Porto, Portugal.
Dessiatinny	Russia	The steamship was destroyed by ice in the Dvina near Arkhangelsk.
Donati	Germany	The steamship ran aground on the Steilsand, in the North Sea off the German coast.
Dr. von Tunon Tellow	Germany	The barque was driven ashore at Misdroy.
Eclipse	United Kingdom	The barque ran aground in the Elbe at Freiburg, Germany. She was refloated with the assistance of a tug.
Emma	United Kingdom	The ship ran aground at Sunderland, County Durham. She was on a voyage from Dieppe, Seine-Inférieure to Sunderland.
Empress of India	United Kingdom	The ship was wrecked on the Kentish Knock on or before 7 June. She was on a voyage from South Shields, County Durham to Trincomalee, Ceylon.
Eno	Germany	The schooner was driven ashore on Læsø, Denmark. She was on a voyage from Danzig to Leer. She was refloated and resumed her voyage.
Farnley Hall	United Kingdom	The steamship ran aground near Rotterdam, South Holland, Netherlands. She was on a voyage from Rotterdam to Elba, Italy.
Gazelle	United Kingdom	The ship ran aground at Sunderland. She was on a voyage from Boulogne, Pas-de-Calais, France to Sunderland.
Grand Duke Alexis	Russia	The steamship was wrecked on Sjuøyane, Svalbard, Norway before 24 June.
Gribanow	Russia	The steamship was severely damaged by ice in the Dvina near Arkhangelsk.
Hotbank	United Kingdom	The ship struck the Blinders, off the coast of Brazil and was run ashore at Recife, where she was wrecked. She was on a voyage from London to the Cape Colony.
Korniloff	Russia	The ship was driven ashore on Marmara Island, Ottoman Empire. She was refloated and taken in to Rodosta, Ottoman Empire in a leaky condition.
Laurens	United States	The ship ran aground in the Delaware River.
Leith	United Kingdom	The steamship was wrecked near Trincomalee, Ceylon after 3 June. She was on a voyage from Calcutta, India to Colombo, Ceylon.
Ligeria	Portugal	The barque was driven ashore 8 nautical miles (15 km) from Pará, Brazil. She was on a voyage from Lisbon to Pará.
Maria	United Kingdom	The schooner was wrecked at Varberg, Sweden. She was on a voyage from Blyth, Northumberland to Rønne, Denmark.
Marmo	Flag unknown	The brig caught fire at Pernambuco, Brazil.
Melicite	Flag unknown	The ship ran aground at Akyab, Burma.
Memento	United Kingdom	The ship sank off the coast of the Newfoundland Colony with the loss of all hands.
Monrovia	United Kingdom	The steamship ran aground at the mouth of the Brass River before 22 June.
Montejo	United States of Colombia	The ship was wrecked near the mouth of the "Sona River". She was on a voyage from Panama City to Nueva Granada.
Montevideo	Italy	The barque was abandoned in the Atlantic Ocean before 6 June.
Northern	Canada	The ship was wrecked on the Île d'Orléans, Quebec before 12 June. She was on a voyage from Quebec City to Pictou, Nova Scotia.
Orient	Italy	The brig was wrecked in the Gulf of Gaeta.
Romulus	United Kingdom	The brig ran aground on the Cockle Sand, in the North Sea off the coast of Norfolk. She was refloated and assisted in to Great Yarmouth, Norfolk.
Rufina	Spain	The ship put in to Pauillac, Gironde, France in a sinking condition. She was on a voyage from Bilbao to Cardiff, Glamorgan, United Kingdom. She was condemned.
Russell	United Kingdom	The steamship foundered off Cape Finisterre, Spain. Her crew were rescued. She was on a voyage from Nicolaieff, Russia to Queenstown, County Cork.
Star	United Kingdom	The ship was driven ashore near Fishguard, Pembrokeshire. She was on a voyage from Port Madoc, Caernarfonshire to Cardiff. She was later refloated and resumed her voyage.
Suomi	(Russian Empire) Grand Duchy of Finland	The steamship ran aground and sank on the "Replotfjard". She was on a voyage from Oulu to Saint Petersburg, Russia.
Victoria	Canada	The brigantine was abandoned in the Atlantic Ocean before 26 June.
Volgoda	Russia	The steamship was severely damaged by ice in the Dvina near Arkhangelsk.
Water Lily	United Kingdom	The ship was driven ashore on Læsø. She was on a voyage from Charlestown, Cornwall to Saint Petersburg. She was refloated and assisted in to Fredrikshavn, Denmark in a severely damaged condition.
Yoreg	Russia	The steamship was severely damaged by ice in the Dvina near Arkhangelsk.
Many unnamed vessels	Russia	A large number of sailing ships were destroyed by ice in the Dvina near Arkhangelsk.
