= List of shipwrecks in November 1853 =

List of shipwrecks in November 1853 includes ships sunk, foundered, wrecked, grounded, or otherwise lost during November 1853.

== 1 November ==
List of shipwrecks: 1 November 1853
Ship	State	Description
Austria	United Kingdom	The ship ran aground and was wrecked off Charleston, South Carolina, United States. She was on a voyage from Liverpool, Lancashire to Charleston.
Compeer	United Kingdom	The schooner ran aground on the Harry Furlongs Reef, in the Irish Sea. She was on a voyage from Liverpool, Lancashire to São Miguel Island, Azores. She was refloated and assisted in to Holyhead, Anglesey in a sinking condition.
Firefly	United Kingdom	The schooner was abandoned in the North Sea. Her crew were rescued by Fortuna (Flag unknown). Firefly was on a voyage from Danzig to London.
John	United Kingdom	The barque ran aground on the Scroby Sands, Norfolk. She was on a voyage from Hartlepool, County Durham to London. She was refloated and taken in to Great Yarmouth, Norfolk in a leaky condition. John took on extra hands and resumed her voyage.
Modeste	France	The ship ran aground on the Barnard Sand, in the North Sea off the coast of Suffolk, United Kingdom. She was on a voyage from Rouen, Seine-Inférieure to Great Yarmouth. She was refloated on 5 November and taken in to Great Yarmouth.
Réunion	France	The ship foundered in the English Channel off Cherbourg, Manche. Her crew were rescued. She was on a voyage from Licata, Sicily to Rouen.
Swalan	Sweden	The ship struck the Brandsten Rock, in the Baltic Sea. She was on a voyage from Stockholm to Hull, Yorkshire, United Kingdom. She put back to Stockholm, where she sank.
Veronica	United Kingdom	The ship was driven ashore at Hartlepool, County Durham. She was on a voyage from London to Hartlepool. She was refloated and taken in to port.

== 2 November ==
List of shipwrecks: 2 November 1853
Ship	State	Description
Agnes	United Kingdom	The ship ran aground on the Pan Sand, in the North Sea off the coast of Kent.
Arvon	United Kingdom	The ship struck a sunken rock in "Rhiena Lough", Ross-shire and sank. Her crew were rescued. She was on a voyage from Newcastle upon Tyne, Northumberland to Galway.
Catherine	United Kingdom	The ship struck the pier at Ramsgate, Kent and was damaged. She was taken in to Ramsgate in a leaky condition.
Harrison	United Kingdom	The barque was abandoned in the Atlantic Ocean. All on board were rescued by Eureka (United Kingdom). Harrison was on a voyage from Glasson Dock, Lancashire to Dalhousie, New Brunswick, British North America.
Hatty Huntington	United States	The brig was driven ashore between Gunna and Tiree, Inner Hebrides, United Kingdom.
Heir Apparent	United Kingdom	The ship ran aground on the Platter Rocks, off Holyhead, Anglesey. She was on a voyage from Holyhead to Liverpool, Lancashire.
Jane Bird	United Kingdom	The ship was wrecked on a reef off Villafranca Islet, Azores with the loss of four of her nine crew.
Julia	United Kingdom	The ship ran aground off Terschelling, Friesland, Netherlands. She was on a voyage from Cardiff, Glamorgan to Harburg.
Lively	United Kingdom	The lugger sank on the Pan Sand during operations to refloat Lively (United Kingdom).
Mathilda	France	The ship ran aground on Scroby Sands, Norfolk, United Kingdom. She was refloated but consequently had to be beached at Caister-on-Sea, Norfolk.
Patriot	(United Kingdom of Great Britain and Ireland) British North America	The ship was abandoned in the Atlantic Ocean. Her crew were rescued by General Washington (United States). Patriot was on a voyage from Nevis to Port Medway, Nova Scotia.
Sara Lydia	Netherlands	The ship ran aground at Plymouth, Devon, United Kingdom. She was on a voyage from Rotterdam, South Holland to Batavia, Netherlands East Indies.
Susan	United Kingdom	The ship was wrecked on the Caskets, off the Channel Islands. Her crew survived. She was on a voyage from Guernsey, Channel Islands to London.
Urania	United Kingdom	The ship was driven ashore at Passage West, County Cork.
Zephyrus	United Kingdom	The ship was driven ashore on Bornholm, Denmark. She was on a voyage from London to Danzig. She was refloated and taken in to Rønne.

== 3 November ==
List of shipwrecks: 3 November 1853
Ship	State	Description
Adventure	United Kingdom	The ship was in collision with Alabama (United Kingdom) and was abandoned in the North Sea off the mouth of the Humber. Her crew were rescued by Alabama. Adventure was on a voyage from South Shields, County Durham to London.
Ann	United Kingdom	The ship ran aground on Sterhorn's Reef, off Gotland, Sweden. She was on a voyage from Riga, Russia to London.
Brother's Friend	United Kingdom	The ship ran aground on the Knowles, in the North Sea off the coast of Suffolk. She was refloated the next day and taken in to Orfordness.
Catherine Maria	Netherlands	The ship ran aground on the Goodwin Sands, Kent, United Kingdom. She was on a voyage from Newcastle upon Tyne, Northumberland, United Kingdom to Montevideo, Uruguay. She was refloated and taken in to Ramsgate, Kent.
Dernby	United Kingdom	The brig was driven ashore on Dalkey Island, County Dublin. She was on a voyage from Newport, Monmouthshire to Queenstown, County Cork. She was refloated and taken in to Dublin for repairs.
Exchange	(United Kingdom of Great Britain and Ireland) New South Wales	The brig was wrecked on the South Reef, off Watsons Bay. All on board were rescued.
Hawk	United Kingdom	The schooner ran aground on the Margate Sand, off the coast of Kent. She was on a voyage from London to Bristol. She was refloated and resumed her voyage.
Lusitania	United Kingdom	The steamship ran aground in the River Mersey at Rock Ferry, Cheshire. She was refloated the next day.
Mary Jane	United Kingdom	The smack was wrecked on The Skerries, off the coast of Anglesey. She was on a voyage from Liverpool, Lancashire to Llanelly, Glamorgan.
Prince of Orange	United Kingdom	The ship fell on her side in the Brunswick Dock at Liverpool. She was righted the next day.
Royal William	United Kingdom	The sailing barge was abandoned in the English Channel. Her crew were rescued by a fishing smack. She was on a voyage from Southampton, Hampshire to Jersey, Channel Islands. She was towed in to Poole, Dorset by the fishing smack.

== 4 November ==
List of shipwrecks: 4 November 1853
Ship	State	Description
Anne	United Kingdom	The ship ran aground on the Herd Sand, in the North Sea off the coast of County Durham. She was refloated and taken in to Newcastle upon Tyne, Northumberland.
Astrea	United Kingdom	The brig ran aground at Great Yarmouth, Norfolk.
Charlotte Harrison	United Kingdom	The ship ran aground on the Blackwater Bank, in the Irish Sea. She was on a voyage from the Clyde to New Orleans, Louisiana, United States. She was refloated and put back to the Clyde in a leaky condition.
E. H. Chapin	United States	The ship was driven ashore at Nassau, Bahamas. She was on a voyage from Livorno, Grand Duchy of Tuscany to New York. She was refloated on 7 November.
Mathilde	United Kingdom	The ship was driven ashore at Corton, Suffolk. She was refloated and taken in to Great Yarmouth.
Quiver	United Kingdom	The smack was driven ashore in Newton Bay, Glamorgan.
Sapphire	United Kingdom	The ship was driven ashore on Burr Isle, County Antrim. She was on a voyage from the Clyde to Melbourne, Victoria.
Victoria	United States	The full-rigged ship was destroyed by fire in the Clyde. She was on a voyage from Broomielaw, Renfrewshire, United Kingdom to New York.

== 5 November ==
List of shipwrecks: 5 November 1853
Ship	State	Description
Acorn	(United Kingdom of Great Britain and Ireland) Guernsey	The ship ran aground on the Stoney Binks, off the mouth of the Humber. She was on a voyage from Danzig to Guernsey. She was refloated the next day and taken in to Grimsby, Lincolnshire.
California Packet	United States	The brig sprang a leak and was abandoned in the Atlantic Ocean. All 59 people on board took to the lifeboat and longboat, but fourteen of them died before the boats landed at "Achil Island", County Mayo. She was on a voyage from Broadhaven Bay to New York.
Courier	United Kingdom	The full-rigged ship ran aground on the Florida Reef. She was on a voyage from New Orleans, Louisiana, United States to Liverpool, Lancashire. She was refloated on 10 November and taken in to Key West, Florida, United States.
Drie Zusters	Prussia	The ship ran aground on Düne, Heligoland and was consequently beached on Heligoland. She was on a voyage from Memel to London, Yorkshire, United Kingdom.
Eau de Ville	(United Kingdom of Great Britain and Ireland) British North America	The ship ran aground at Merigomish, Nova Scotia. She was on a voyage from Pugwash, Nova Scotia to Liverpool, Lancashire. She was consequently condemned.
Gondola	United Kingdom	The ship was driven ashore and wrecked at Millisle, County Down She was on a voyage from Troon, Ayrshire to Cuba. She was refloated on 23 November and towed in to Donaghadee, County Down.
Lars Nysted	Danzig	The schooner ran aground on the Trinity Sand, in the North Sea and sank. Her crew were rescued. She was on a voyage from Danzig to Hull, United Kingdom. She was refloated on 9 November and towed in to Grimsby.
Mary	United Kingdom	The sloop was driven ashore and severely damaged east of Porthcawl, Glamorgan. She was refloated.
Patriot	United Kingdom	The smack was driven ashore at Red Bay, County Antrim. She was on a voyage from Troon, Ayrshire to Red Bay.
Swift	United Kingdom	The ship was driven ashore on Terschelling, Friesland, Netherlands. She was on a voyage from Newport, Monmouthshire to Hamburg. She was refloated on 8 November and taken in to Texel, North Holland, Netherlands.
Victoria	United Kingdom	The ship was driven ashore and wrecked at the mouth of the River Shannon. She was on a voyage from Limerick to London.

== 6 November ==
List of shipwrecks: 6 November 1853
Ship	State	Description
Catharina	Netherlands	The ship sank. Her crew were rescued. She was on a voyage from Kjerteminde, Denmark to Amsterdam, North Holland.
Chance	United Kingdom	The brig was in collision with William Rathbone (United Kingdom) and was abandoned. Her crew were rescued by William Rathbone. Chance was on a voyage from Viana do Castelo, Portugal to Newfoundland, British North America.
Koninglyke	Netherlands	The ship was driven ashore at Hellevoetsluis, Zeeland. She was on a voyage from Hartlepool, County Durham, United Kingdom to Hellevoetsluis.
Lannistad	Danzig	The ship ran aground on the Trinity Sand, in the North Sea and sank. Her crew were rescued. She was on a voyage from Danzig to Hull, Yorkshire, United Kingdom.
Mary and Jane	United Kingdom	The ship was wrecked on The Skerries, Anglesey with the loss of a crew member.
Ringwood	United Kingdom	The ship ran aground on the Barber Sand, in the North Sea off the coast of Norfolk and was abandoned by her crew. She was later refloated and taken in to Great Yarmouth, Norfolk in a derelict condition.
Victoria	United Kingdom	The ship was driven ashore near Newcastle, County Down. She was on a voyage from Dublin to Belfast, County Antrim. She was refloated on 8 November and taken in to Newcastle.

== 7 November ==
List of shipwrecks: 7 November 1853
Ship	State	Description
Annie Hall	(United Kingdom of Great Britain and Ireland) British North America	The barque was wrecked on a reef off St. Peter's Island. She was on a voyage from Charlottetown, Prince Edward Island to Newfoundland.
Betsey	United Kingdom	The ship ran aground off Cuxhaven.
Maid of Athens	United Kingdom	The ship ran aground on the Holme Sand, in the North Sea off the coast of Suffolk. She was on a voyage from Blyth, Northumberland to London. She was refloated and resumed her voyage.

== 8 November ==
List of shipwrecks: 8 November 1853
Ship	State	Description
Dido	United Kingdom	The ship ran aground on the Sandhammer Reef, in the Baltic Sea. She was on a voyage from Danzig to Sunderland, County Durham. She was refloated on 11 November and taken in to Ystad, Sweden before sailing to Helsingør, Denmark for repairs.
Eleanore	France	The schooner was wrecked on the Goodwin Sands, Kent, United Kingdom with the loss of all but two of those on board. Three would-be rescuers were also drowned. The survivors were rescued by the lugger Ondine (United Kingdom) and another lugger. Eleanore was on a voyage from Luleå, Sweden to Dunkirk, Nord.
Fancy	United Kingdom	The ship was driven ashore on Bornholm, Denmark. She was on a voyage from London to Kronstadt, Russia. She was refloated on 12 November and taken in to Rønne in a severely damaged and leaky condition.
Foudroyant	Imperial Russian Navy	Crimean War: The steam frigate ran aground at Batumi, Ottoman Empire and was sunk by land-based artillery with the loss of more than 1,500 lives. Twenty-six people were rescued by Nile (Egyptian Navy).
Hannah	United Kingdom	The ship was driven ashore and wrecked at Happisburgh, Norfolk.
Lawson	United Kingdom	The ship ran aground off Scharhörn. She was on a voyage from Leith, Lothian to Hamburg. She was refloated the next day and taken in to the Elbe.
Northumberland	United Kingdom	The lifeboat ran aground on the Goodwin Sands and capsized whilst going to the aid of Eleanore (France). She was righted.
Victor	(United Kingdom of Great Britain and Ireland) British North America	The ship was wrecked on White Head Island, New Brunswick.
Washti	Sweden	The brig ran aground on the Haisborough Sands, in the North Sea off the coast of Norfolk, United Kingdom. Her crew were rescued. She was on a voyage from Hernosand to London, United Kingdom. She was refloated and taken in to Great Yarmouth, Norfolk in a derelict condition.

== 9 November ==
List of shipwrecks: 9 November 1853
Ship	State	Description
Arthur	(United Kingdom of Great Britain and Ireland) British North America	The ship was abandoned in the Atlantic Ocean, having collided with a barque on 5 November. Her crew were rescued by Glasgow (United Kingdom). Arthur was on a voyage from Tatamagouche, Nova Scotia to Liverpool, Lancashire.
Eaudeville	United Kingdom	The ship was driven ashore near Pictou, Nova Scotia. She was on a voyage from Pugwash, Nova Scotia to Liverpool, Lancashire.
Lady Bulwer (1851 ship)	United Kingdom	The full-rigged ship sprang a leak and sank off "Moose Pecca Island". Her crew were rescued. She was on a voyage from New York to Quebec City, Province of Canada, British North America.
Mary	United Kingdom	The ship ran aground on the Doom Bar and was abandoned by her crew. She was refloated and taken in to Padstow, Cornwall.
Pregel	Prussia	The ship was driven ashore and wrecked at Lybster, Caithness, United Kingdom. Her crew survived.
Spray	(United Kingdom of Great Britain and Ireland) British North America	The ship was wrecked near "Gabarns", Cape Breton Island, Nova Scotia. She was on a voyage from Saint John's, Newfoundland to Quebec City.

== 10 November ==
List of shipwrecks: November 1853
Ship	State	Description
Eugenie	(flag) France	The ship ran aground on the Haisborough Sands, in the North Sea off the coast of Norfolk, United Kingdom. She was on a voyage from Newcastle upon Tyne, Northumberland, United Kingdom to Rio de Janeiro, Brazil. She had become a wreck by 12 November.
Marys	United Kingdom	The schooner was driven ashore south of Donaghadee, County Down. She was on a voyage from Waterford to the Clyde. She was refloated and put in to Donaghadee in a leaky condition.
Robert and George	United Kingdom	The brig was driven ashore in the Scheldt. She was on a voyage from Antwerp, Belgium to South Shields, County Durham. She was refloated.

== 11 November ==
List of shipwrecks: 11 November 1853
Ship	State	Description
Ariadne	United Kingdom	The barque foundered in the Atlantic Ocean off Lisbon, Portugal. Her ten crew were rescued by a French brig. She was on a voyage from Livorno, Grand Duchy of Tuscany to London.
Atalanta	United Kingdom	The ship was driven ashore at Rangoon, Burma.
Choice	United Kingdom	The snow was wrecked on a reef off Gotland, Sweden. Her crew survived. She was on a voyage from Kronstadt, Russia to London.
Elizabeth Lewis	United Kingdom	The brig ran aground on the Longsand or the Shipwash Sand, in the North Sea off the coast of Essex. She was on a voyage from Dundee, Forfarshire to Melbourne, Victoria. Elizabeth Laws was refloated on 13 November with the assistance of several smacks and taken in to Harwich, Essex for repairs.
Francesco	Kingdom of Sardinia	The brig was discovered abandoned and ashore north of Ballyferris Point, County Down, United Kingdom. She was on a voyage from the River Clyde to Genoa. She was refloated and towed in to Belfast, County Antrim, United Kingdom in a leaky condition.
Harriet	United Kingdom	The ship ran ashore at Paignton, Devon. She was on a voyage from Newcastle upon Tyne, Northumberland to Brixham, Devon. She was refloated on 14 November and taken in to Brixham.
John Black	United Kingdom	The ship was driven ashore at Utlängen, Sweden. She was on a voyage from Riga, Russia to Newry, County Antrim. She was refloated and towed in to Karlskrona, Sweden in a leaky condition.
Marine	United Kingdom	The brig was driven ashore at Cape Cod, Massachusetts, United States. She was on a voyage from Sydney, Nova Scotia, British North America to Boston, Massachusetts.
Patriot	United Kingdom	The ship was driven ashore and wrecked at Belfast, County Antrim.

== 12 November ==
List of shipwrecks: 12 November 1853
Ship	State	Description
Clarendon	United States	The barque was driven ashore on the Turneffe Atoll, British Honduras. She was later refloated and put in to Belize City, British Honduras, where she arrived on 19 November.
Fanny	(United Kingdom of Great Britain and Ireland) New South Wales	The brig was wrecked on the Oyster Bank, off Newcastle. Her crew were rescued, but two rescuers were drowned.
Norveguesa	Spain	The schooner was driven ashore west of Blakeney, Norfolk, United Kingdom. She was on a voyage from Bergen, Norway to Bilbao. She was refloated and taken in to Blakeney.
Welthin	United Kingdom	The ship was driven ashore at Portsmouth, Hampshire. She was on a voyage from Sunderland, County Durham to Southampton, Hampshire. She was refloated the next day and completed her voyage.
William	(United Kingdom of Great Britain and Ireland) British North America	The ship was driven ashore in the Bersemis River. She was on a voyage from Quebec City, Province of Canada to Newfoundland.

== 13 November ==
List of shipwrecks: 13 November 1853
Ship	State	Description
Dolphin	United Kingdom	The brig was driven ashore on Hope Island, India. She was on a voyage from Vizagapatam to Madras, India.
Hoffnung	Kingdom of Hanover	The ship was wrecked on the Memmert Sand, in the North Sea. Her crew were rescued. She was on a voyage from Newcastle upon Tyne, Northumberland, United Kingdom to Leer.
Nora	United Kingdom	The ship ran aground and sank at Rye, Sussex. She was on a voyage from Hartlepool, County Durham to Rye.
Ville de Paris	France	The ship struck the Vandrée rock, off Le Conquet, Finistère and sank. She was on a voyage from Seaham, County Durham to Bordeaux, Gironde.

== 14 November ==
List of shipwrecks: 14 November 1853
Ship	State	Description
Anne	United Kingdom	The ship was wrecked 50 nautical miles (93 km) off Anticosti Island, Nova Scotia, British North America. Her crew were rescued. She was on a voyage from Quebec City, Province of Canada, British North America to Bristol, Gloucestershire.
Hartlepool	United Kingdom	The brig ran aground on Scroby Sands, Norfolk. She was on a voyage from Sunderland, County Durham to London. She was refloated and taken in to Great Yarmouth, Norfolk.
Leander	United Kingdom	The ship was wrecked at Irwin, Swan River Colony. She was on a voyage from Perth, Swan River Colonhy to Batavia, Netherlands East Indies.
Marie	United Kingdom	The ship struck the Corsair Rock, off Point Nepean, Victoria and was consequently beached. She was on a voyage from Liverpool, Lancashire to Melbourne, Victoria. She was later refloated with assistance from a steamship and taken in to Hobsons Bay.
Ontario	United Kingdom	The ship struck the Corsair Rock and was wrecked. She was on a voyage from London to Melbourne.
St. Patrick	United Kingdom	The ship was driven ashore near Quebec City, Province of Canada, British North America. She was on a voyage from Quebec City to London.
No. 17	United Kingdom	The pilot boat was driven ashore and wrecked 2 nautical miles (3.7 km) east of Ilfracombe, Devon. She was refloated on 16 November and taken in tow for Ilfracombe, but foundered.

== 15 November ==
List of shipwrecks: 15 November 1853
Ship	State	Description
Ellen	United Kingdom	The schooner capsized whilst being towed from Greenock to Glasgow, Renfrewshire. Her crew were rescued. She was taken in to Glasgow and righted
Lucy	United Kingdom	The fill-rigged ship was driven ashore at Jurby, Isle of Man. Her 23 crew were rescued. She was on a voyage from Liverpool, Lancashire to Mobile, Alabama, United States.
William	United Kingdom	The lighter was in collision with another vessel at Passage West, County Cork. Her anchor was driven through her bow and she sank. She was on a voyage from Haulbowline to Cork.

== 16 November ==
List of shipwrecks: 16 November 1853
Ship	State	Description
Experiment	United Kingdom	The sloop sprang a leak and was beached at Rhyl, Denbighshire. She was on a voyage from Glasgow, Renfrewshire to Saltney, Cheshire. She had been refloated, taken in to Rhyl and repaired and resumed her voyage by 18 November.
Fairy	United Kingdom	The steamship ran aground 3 nautical miles (5.6 km) from King's Lynn, Norfolk. She was on a voyage from Hull, Yorkshire to King's Lynn. She was refloated.
Richard Cobden	United Kingdom	The ship ran aground on the Pelican Spit. She was on a voyage from Smyrna, Ottoman Empire to London. She was refloated on 24 November and resumed her voyage.

== 17 November ==
List of shipwrecks: 17 November 1853
Ship	State	Description
Diligence	Netherlands	The ship ran aground on the Kentish Knock. She was on a voyage from Hartlepool, County Durham, United Kingdom to Batavia, Netherlands East Indies. She was refloated and anchored off Margate, Kent.
May Queen	United Kingdom	The ship ran aground on the North Haaks Bank, in the North Sea off the Dutch coast. She was on a voyage from Newport, Monmouthshire to Harburg, Hamburg. She was refloated and taken in to the Nieuw Diep.
Minerva	United Kingdom	The brig ran aground and was damaged on the Holme Sand, in the North Sea off the coast of Suffolk. She was refloated and taken in to Lowestoft in a leaky condition.
Susan and Ann	United Kingdom	The ship ran aground in the Caledonian Canal. She was on a voyage from Saint Petersburg, Russia to Belfast, County Antrim. She was refloated and completed her voyage, arriving on 9 December.

== 18 November ==
List of shipwrecks: 18 November 1853
Ship	State	Description
Hoffnung	Kingdom of Hanover	The ship was wrecked. Her crew were rescued. She was on a voyage from Newcastle upon Tyne, Northumberland to Emden.
John	United Kingdom	The ship ran aground at Poole, Dorset. She was on a voyage from Saundersfoot, Pembrokeshire to Poole. She was refloated and taken in to Poole.
Margaret	United Kingdom	The schooner ran aground on the Herd Sand, in the North Sea off the coast of County Durham.
Neva	United Kingdom	The ship was wrecked near Turku, Grand Duchy of Finland. Her crew were rescued. She was on a voyage from Holmsund, Sweden to London. Neva was discovered off Åland on 3 December and taken in to "Karingsund".
William Jardine	United Kingdom	The ship was wrecked in the Hooghly River. She was on a voyage from London to Calcutta, India.

== 19 November ==
List of shipwrecks: 19 November 1853
Ship	State	Description
Courier	Denmark	The ship was wrecked off "Hunsbye".
Eduardo	Kingdom of Sardinia	The ship was driven ashore at "Guimaraens", Brazil. She was on a voyage from Rio de Janeiro, Brazil to Falmouth, Cornwall, United Kingdom.
Heroine	United Kingdom	The ship was driven ashore in the Saint Lawrence River.
Hope	United Kingdom	The steam barque ran aground on the Millevaches Shoals, in the Saint Lawrence River. She was refloated on 9 May 1854 and taken in to Quebec City, Province of Canada, British North America.
Maine	United States	The ship was wrecked at Pond Island, Maine. She was on a voyage from Liverpool, Lancashire, United Kingdom to Bath, Maine.
William Broderick	United Kingdom	The ship was driven ashore on Stoneskar, Russia. She was on a voyage from Kronstadt, Russia to London. She was refloated on 25 November and was subsequently taken in to Reval, Russia.

== 20 November ==
List of shipwrecks: 20 November 1853
Ship	State	Description
Brigand	United Kingdom	The ship was in collision with Palmyra (United Kingdom) and sank in the North Sea off the coast of Yorkshire. Her crew were rescued. She was on a voyage from Arkhangelsk, Russia to Aberdeen.
Canada	United Kingdom	The ship ran aground on the Holme Sand, in the North Sea off the coast of Suffolk. She was on a voyage from South Shields, County Durham to London. She was refloated.
Garland	United Kingdom	The ship ran aground on the Girdler Sand, off the coast of Kent. She was on a voyage from London to Jamaica. She was refloated and resumed her voyage.
Lady Mulgrave	United Kingdom	The brigantine was driven ashore and wrecked on Rathlin Island, County Donegal. Her crew were rescued. She was on a voyage from Londonderry to Troon, Ayrshire.
Maria	Norway	The ship was wrecked on Skiathos, Greece. Five of her crew were rescued.
Marie	Kingdom of Hanover	The ship foundered in the North Sea. Her crew were rescued. She was on a voyage from Norway to Delfzijl, Groningen, Netherlands.
Mercia	United Kingdom	The ship ran aground on the Holme Sand. She was refloated and resumed her voyage.

== 21 November ==
List of shipwrecks: 21 November 1853
Ship	State	Description
Ann Elizabeth	United States	The ship was driven ashore and wrecked at "Magna", Jamaica.
Habbes	Norway	The ship was wrecked.
Jeune Adolph	France	The brig ran aground on the Goodwin Sands, Kent, United Kingdom. She was on a voyage from Caen, Calvados to Newcastle upon Tyne, Northumberland, United Kingdom. She was refloated and taken in to The Downs.
Lapwing	(United Kingdom of Great Britain and Ireland) British North America	The ship was driven ashore and wrecked at "Magna".
Prospect	United States	The ship was driven ashore and wrecked at "Magna".
Raisbeck	United Kingdom	The ship was driven ashore at "Skellinge", Duchy of Schleswig. She was on a voyage from Kronstadt, Russia to Sunderland, County Durham. She was refloated and resumed her voyage.
Robert	(United Kingdom of Great Britain and Ireland) Jamaica	The ship was driven ashore and wrecked at "Magna".
Wordie	United States	The ship was driven ashore and wrecked at "Magna".

== 22 November ==
List of shipwrecks: 22 November 1853
Ship	State	Description
Childe Harold	United Kingdom	The ship ran aground and was severely damaged on the Goodwin Sands, Kent. She was on a voyage from Sydney, New South Wales to London. She was refloated and taken in tow, being severely leaky.
Earl St. Vincent	United Kingdom	The ship was damaged by fire at King's Lynn, Norfolk.
Lynher	United Kingdom	The ship was damaged by fire at King's Lynn.

== 23 November ==
List of shipwrecks: 23 November 1853
Ship	State	Description
Arctic	United States	The steamship ran aground on the Burbo Bank, in Liverpool Bay. She was on a voyage from New York to Liverpool, Lancashire, United Kingdom. She was refloated and taken in to Liverpool.
Eleanor and Betty	United Kingdom	The ship ran aground and sank at Aberdyfi, Merionethshire. Her crew were rescued. She was on a voyage from Caernarfon to Aberdyfi.
Eliza and Ann	United Kingdom	The ship ran aground off Yarmouth, Isle of Wight. She was on a voyage from Youghal, County Cork to London. She was refloated.
Fawn	United Kingdom	The ship was wrecked at Jamaica.
Jessie McClure	United Kingdom	The ship departed from Maryport, Cumberland for Belfast, County Antrim. No further trace, presumed foundered with the loss of all hands.
Rose McRoom	United Kingdom	The ship ran aground at Passage West, County Cork. She was on a voyage from Cardiff, Glamorgan to Waterford.

== 24 November ==
List of shipwrecks: 24 November 1853
Ship	State	Description
Australia	United Kingdom	The brig was driven ashore at Buctouche, New Brunswick. She was consequently condemned.
Bolivar	United Kingdom	The brig foundered in the Atlantic Ocean. Her crew were rescued. She was on a voyage from Demerara, British Guiana to London.
General Armero	Spain	The steamship was wrecked on Cayo Romano. Her crew were rescued. She was on a voyage from St. Jago de Cuba to Havana, Cuba.
Helen	United Kingdom	The ship was driven ashore in Kilchattan Bay. She was on a voyage from Greenock, Renfrewshire to Newfoundland, British North America.
Independence	United Kingdom	The smack sprang a leak and sank at Tralee, County Kerry. She was on a voyage from Cork to Tralee.
Margery	United Kingdom	The ship was wrecked in St. George's Bay, Newfoundland. Her crew were rescued. She was on a voyage from Dalhousie, New Brunswick, British North America to Stockton-on-Tees, County Durham.
Orestes	United Kingdom	The brig ran aground on a reef off Egg Harbour, New Jersey and sank. Her crew were rescued.
Robert Nicol	United Kingdom	The ship was wrecked near Boulmer, Northumberland. Her crew were rescued by the Boulmer Lifeboat.
Wupper	Netherlands	The ship ran aground on Schoelbeck. She was refloated and taken in to Hellevoetsluis, Zeeland.

== 25 November ==
List of shipwrecks: 26 November 1853
Ship	State	Description
Lady Knight	United States	The ship was abandoned in the Atlantic Ocean. Her crew were rescued by Samuel M. Fox. Lady Knight was on a voyage from the Clyde to Boston, Massachusetts.
Newcastle and Berwick Packet	United Kingdom	The ship was driven ashore at St. Andrews, Fife. She was on a voyage from Newcastle upon Tyne, Northumberland to St. Andrews.
Osmanli	United Kingdom	The steamship was wrecked in D'Estrees Bay, Kangaroo Islands, South Australia. All 83 people on board were rescued. She was on a voyage from Melbourne, Victoria to Port Adelaide, South Australia.
Sarah	Belgium	The ship departed from Pernambuco, Brazil for Antwerp. No further trace, presumed foundered with the loss of all hands.

== 26 November ==
List of shipwrecks: 26 November 1853
Ship	State	Description
Albany	United States	Albany in 2015. Carrying 200 passengers and various supplies, the wooden paddle steamer went aground in Lake Huron near Presque Isle, Michigan. She was destroyed by a storm on 27 November and sank in 5 feet (1.5 m) of water at 45.323267°N 083.458467°W.
Jane and Mary	United Kingdom	The ship ran aground at Portmadoc. She was on a voyage from Portmadoc to Great Yarmouth, Norfolk. She was refloated and resumed her voyage.
Mary Ann	United Kingdom	The ship was run into and sunk in the River Lagan by Telegraph (United Kingdom). Her crew were rescued.
Nordew	Sweden	The ship was driven ashore.
Quirina en Anna	Netherlands	The brig ran aground on the Longsand, in the North Sea off the coast of Essex, United Kingdom. Her crew were rescued by the Sunk Lightship ( Trinity House). She floated off but was subsequently wrecked on the Shipwash Sand.

== 27 November ==
List of shipwrecks: 27 November 1853
Ship	State	Description
Achilles	United Kingdom	The ship was driven ashore on "Crane Island", Province of Canada, British North America.
Bengal	United States	The ship, which had sprung a leak on 17 November, was beached on Terceira Island, Azores, where she subsequently became a wreck. Her crew survived. She was on a voyage from Cádiz, Spain to Beverly, Massachusetts.
Dido	United Kingdom	The ship was driven ashore at Hong Kong.
Ella	United States	The ship was driven ashore and wrecked at Cape Canso, Newfoundland, British North America. She was on a voyage from Pictou, Nova Scotia, British North America to Bangor, Maine.
George Carl	United Kingdom	The ship ran aground at Pillau, Prussia.
Jane Prowse	United Kingdom	The ship was driven ashore and wrecked at "Breckbe", Puerto Rico with the loss of six lives.
Lydiane	Denmark	The ship was in collision with the Læsø Lightship (Denmark) and sank. She was on a voyage from Kalundborg to Brevig, Norway.
Nordern	Sweden	The schooner was wrecked in "Salterna Sound". She was on a voyage from Visby to an English port.
Olive Branch	UKGBI	The clipper, a barque, was wrecked on the Long Bar Reef. She was on a voyage from Baltimore, Maryland to San Francisco, California.
Theobald	United Kingdom	The schooner was wrecked at the Point of Strohaird, Isle of Skye. She was on a voyage from Galway to Liverpool, Lancashire.
Victoria Packet	(United Kingdom of Great Britain and Ireland) Victoria	The coaster ran aground on the Point Lonsdale Reef. She was on a voyage from Sydney New South Wales to Geelong. She was refloated and taken in to Melbourne the next day. She collided with the brig Mercury ( (United Kingdom of Great Britain and Ireland) ) Victoria and was beached in Swan Bay. She was refloated on 29 November and resumed her voyage.

== 28 November ==
List of shipwrecks: 28 November 1853
Ship	State	Description
Britannia	United Kingdom	The ship was holed by ice and sank at Quebec City, Province of Canada, British North America.
Britannia	United Kingdom	The brig was driven ashore and wrecked near Portaferry, County Down. She was on a voyage from London to Belfast, County Antrim.
British Queen	United Kingdom	The barque was surrounded by ice and abandoned at Quebec City. She was later taken into a place of safety.
British Queen	United Kingdom	The ship was damaged by fire at Calcutta, India.
Concordia	United Kingdom	The ship was driven ashore on "Crane Island", Province of Canada.
Eliza	United Kingdom	The barque was wrecked 28 nautical miles (52 km) south of Cape Henry, Virginia, United States with the loss of a crew member. She was on a voyage from Callao, Peru to Baltimore, Maryland, United States.
Elizabeth	United Kingdom	The barque was driven ashore at Rivière-du-Loup, Province of Canada.
Emma	United Kingdom	The ship was in collision with Carleton (United Kingdom) and was partly abandoned in the North Sea off the coast of Yorkshire. Four of her eight crew got on board Carleton. Emma was on a voyage from Wisbech, Cambridgeshire to Seaham, County Durham. She was subsequently towed in to Hartlepool, County Durham by a smack.
James	United Kingdom	The ship was driven ashore at Nassau, Bahamas. She was on a voyage from Belize City, British Honduras to a British port.
J. K. L.	United Kingdom	The full-rigged ship was driven ashore on "Hare Island", Province of Canada.
John Calvin	United Kingdom	The ship was driven ashore and wrecked at Carnsore Point, County Wexford. Her crew were rescued. She was on a voyage from Antwerp, Belgium to Liverpool, Lancashire.
Lord Ravensworth	United Kingdom	The ship foundered off Palma de Mallorca, Spain. Her crew were rescued. She was on a voyage from the River Tyne to Genoa, Kingdom of Sardinia.
Marshall	Hamburg	The steamship collided with the barque Woodhouse (United Kingdom) and sank 6 nautical miles (11 km) off the mouth of the Humber with the loss of all 58 people on board. She was on a voyage from Stockholm, Sweden to Hull, Yorkshire.
Royal Bride	United Kingdom	The ship ran aground on the Koppergrund, in the Baltic Sea and was wrecked. Her crew were rescued. She was on a voyage from Kronstadt, Russia to London.
Sutton	United Kingdom	The brig was driven ashore on "Hare Island", Province of Canada.
Waterlilly	United Kingdom	The full-rigged ship was driven ashore on "Hare Island", Province of Canada. She subsequently broke in two.
Wilson	United Kingdom	The full-rigged ship was driven ashore on "Hare Island", Province of Canada. She was on a voyage from Quebec City to Bristol, Gloucestershire. She was refloated on 1 December and resumed her voyage.

== 29 November ==
List of shipwrecks: 29 November 1853
Ship	State	Description
Elizabeth Moore	United Kingdom	The ship was in collision with another vessel and was abandoned in the North Sea. Her crew survived. She was on a voyage from Hamburg to Liverpool, Lancashire. Elizabeth Moore was taken in to Great Yarmouth in a severely damaged condition.
Emerald Isle	United Kingdom	The ship was driven ashore at Liverpool. She was on a voyage from Saint John, New Brunswick, British North America to Liverpool. She was refloated with the aid of two tugs.
Evan Dumas	Bremen	The ship ran aground on the Redcar Rocks, on the coast of Yorkshire, United Kingdom. She was on a voyage from Riga, Russia to Hull, Yorkshire. She was refloated and taken in to Hartlepool, County Durham.
Haabets Anker	Norway	The barque ran aground on the Pole Sand, in the English Channel off the coast of Devon, United Kingdom. She was on a voyage from Norway to Exeter, Devon. She floated off, came ashore and was wrecked near Exmouth, Devon. Her crew were rescued.
Kangaroo	United Kingdom	The steamship was driven ashore at Liverpool. She was on a voyage from Bordeaux, Gironde, France to Liverpool. She was refloated.
Prometheus	United Kingdom	The ship was wrecked on the Seaton House Rocks, on the coast of Northumberland.
Sheraton Grange	United Kingdom	The brig was driven ashore and wrecked at Southwold, Suffolk. Her crew were rescued by the Southwold Lifeboat. She was on a voyage from Sunderland, County Durham to London. Sheraton Grange floated off and sank.
Vulcan	United Kingdom	The ship ran aground on the Corton Sand, in the North Sea off the coast of Suffolk. She was on a voyage from Hartlepool, County Durham to London.

== 30 November ==
List of shipwrecks: 30 November 1853
Ship	State	Description
Albany	(United Kingdom of Great Britain and Ireland) British North America	The steamship was driven ashore on Presque Isle, in Lake Huron. All on board were rescued by Herald ( (United Kingdom of Great Britain and Ireland) ).
Allen Brown	United Kingdom	The ship was wrecked on Seal Island, Nova Scotia, British North America. She was on a voyage from Belfast, County Antrim to Saint John, New Brunswick, British North America.
Avni Illah	Ottoman Navy	Crimean War, Battle of Sinop: The frigate was badly damaged by gunfire from the ship-of-the-line Imperatritsa Maria (Imperial Russian Navy) in the harbor at Sinop and ran aground.
Damiat	Egyptian Navy	Crimean War, Battle of Sinop: The frigate was damaged by gunfire from an Imperial Russian Navy squadron in the harbor at Sinop and ran aground.
Erkelye	Ottoman Navy	Crimean War, Battle of Sinop: The armed steamer was wrecked by gunfire from an Imperial Russian Navy squadron in the harbor at Sinop.
Fazlullah	Ottoman Navy	Crimean War, Battle of Sinop: The frigate was set afire by gunfire from the ship-of-the-line Imperatritsa Maria (Imperial Russian Navy) in the harbor at Sinop and ran aground.
Feyz Mabud	Ottoman Navy	Crimean War, Battle of Sinop: The corvette was damaged by gunfire from an Imperial Russian Navy squadron in the harbor at Sinop and ran aground.
Howard	United Kingdom	Crimean War, Battle of Sinop: The ship was destroyed at Sinop.
Jesusa	Spain	The brig ran aground on the Arklow Bank or the Wicklow Bank, in the Irish Sea and was damaged. She was on a voyage from Liverpool, Lancashire, United Kingdom to Pará, Brazil. She was refloated and put in to Holyhead, Anglesey, United Kingdom in a leaky condition.
Kaid Zafer	Ottoman Navy	Crimean War, Battle of Sinop: The frigate was damaged by gunfire from a squadron in the harbor at Sinop and ran aground.
Kel Saphid	Ottoman Navy	Crimean War, Battle of Sinop: The corvette exploded and sank after being hit by gunfire from an Imperial Russian Navy squadron in the harbor at Sinop.
Navek Bahri	Ottoman Navy	Crimean War, Battle of Sinop: The frigate exploded and sank after being hit by gunfire from an Imperial Russian Navy squadron in the harbor at Sinop.
Nejm Fisham	Ottoman Navy	Crimean War, Battle of Sinop: The corvette was wrecked by gunfire from a squadron in the harbor at Sinop.
Nessin Zair	Ottoman Navy	Crimean War, Battle of Sinop: The frigate was damaged by gunfire from an Imperial Russian Navy squadron in the harbor at Sinop and ran aground after her anchor chain broke.
Nizamieh	Ottoman Navy	Crimean War, Battle of Sinop: The frigate was damaged by gunfire from an Imperial Russian Navy squadron in the harbor at Sinop in the Ottoman Empire and ran aground after losing two masts.
Svea	Sweden	The ship ran aground on the Well Bank, in the North Sea. She was on a voyage from Gothenburg to Melbourne, Victoria.

== Unknown date ==
List of shipwrecks: Unknown date in November 1853
Ship	State	Description
Ætna	United Kingdom	The ship ran aground in the River Yare after 4 November. She was on a voyage from Saint Petersburg, Russia to London. She was refloated after being aground for nine or ten days, and sailed on 20 November.
Anne	United Kingdom	The brig ran aground on the Beaumont Shoals before 9 November. All on board were rescued. She was on a voyage from London to Quebec City, Province of Canada, British North America. She had been refloated by 12 November.
August	United Kingdom	The brig was abandoned in the Atlantic Ocean before 14 November.
Christina	United Kingdom	The ship was driven ashore in the Dardanelles before 12 November. She was on a voyage from London to Constantinople, Ottoman Empire. She was refloated on 24 November and taken in to Gallipoli.
Callender	United Kingdom	The ship was driven ashore near the Belém Tower, Lisbon, Portugal. She was on a voyage from Sunderland, County Durham to Lisbon. She was refloated.
David Clarke	United Kingdom	The ship ran aground and was damaged in the Strait of Sunda before 19 November. She was refloated and put in to Batavia, Netherlands East Indies.
Electric	United Kingdom	The ship was driven ashore at Rivière-du-Loup, Province of Canada. She was refloated and taken in tow, but consequently sank. Her crew survived. She was on a voyage from Quebec City to Bideford, Devon. Electric was later refloated and taken in to the Saguenay River.
Gem	United Kingdom	The schooner was presumed to have foundered with the loss of all hands. She was on a voyage from Montrose, Forfarshire to London. A boat from the ship came ashore at Buckhaven, Fife in December.
Gipsy Queen	United Kingdom	The brigantine was driven ashore at Ship Harbour, Nova Scotia. She was condemned.
Golconda	United Kingdom	The ship was driven ashore on the coast of Burma before 11 November. She was later refloated and taken in to Calcutta, India for repairs.
Haabet	Denmark	The jacht was driven ashore at Harboøre. She was refloated on 10 November and taken in to the Agger Canal.
Heinrich	Flag unknown	The ship was driven ashore near Kuressaare, Russia before 2 November. She was refloated and taken in to Kuressaare for repairs.
Herald	United Kingdom	The ship was wrecked at Matane, Province of Canada. She was on a voyage from Sharpness, Gloucestershire to Quebec City.
Holington	United Kingdom	The barque foundered in the Atlantic Ocean. Her crew were rescued. She was on a voyage from London to Cádiz, Spain.
Hvalen	Norway	The schooner was abandoned in the North Sea before 12 November. She was taken in to "Wuust", Denmark in a derelict condition.
Inske Wilderwanck	Flag unknown	The ship was driven ashore on Saaremaa, Russia. Her crew were rescued.
Iona	United Kingdom	The ship ran aground on the Cherchino Reef, in the Mediterranean Sea. She was on a voyage from Alexandria, Egypt to an English port. She was refloated and taken in to Cagliari, Sardinia, where she arrived on 15 November.
Irelande	United Kingdom	The barque was driven ashore on "Basque Island", Province of Canada between 19 and 28 November. She was on a voyage from Montreal, Province of Canada to Gloucester.
J. C. Fremont	United Kingdom	The brig was abandoned in the Atlantic Ocean before 6 November.
Juno	United Kingdom	The ship was driven ashore at "Aja", Sweden. She was refloated on 10 November and taken in to Slitohamn. She was consequently condemned.
Juverna	United States	The ship was wrecked on Rose Island, Bahamas. She was on a voyage from Kingston, Jamaica to New York.
Lapland	United Kingdom	The ship was wrecked at Trescot, Maine, United States. She was on a voyage from Saint John, New Brunswick, British North America to Liverpool, Lancashire.
Louisiana	(United Kingdom of Great Britain and Ireland) British North America	The schooner was wrecked at Cape Chat, Province of Canada.
Ludvig	Russia	The ship was wrecked on Saaremaa. She was on a voyage from Kronstadt, Russia to London.
Ouzel Galley	United Kingdom	The ship ran aground in the Essequibo River. She was on a voyage from Demerara, British Guiana to Queenstown, County Cork. She was refloated and put in to Antigua, where she arrived on 14 November in a leaky condition.
Pabos	(United Kingdom of Great Britain and Ireland) British North America	The ship was abandoned at Saint-Roch, Quebec City.
Sabine et François	Belgium	The barque was wrecked on the Quintero Reefs before 15 November. Her crew were rescued. She was on a voyage from Iquique, Chile to Falmouth, Cornwall, United Kingdom. Sabine et François had been refloated by 31 December and towed in to Valparaíso, Chile by the steamship Firefly (Flag unknown).
Savinto	Russia	The schooner was driven ashore crewless near "Kilpsare", Grand Duchy of Finland before 20 November. She was on a voyage from Reval to Kiel, Prussia.
Sea of Azov	Russia	Crimean War: The steamship was severely damaged by Ottoman artillery fire at "Port Nicolai" with the loss of 26 of her 126 crew. She subsequently put in to Kertch in a wrecked condition.
Shamrock	United Kingdom	The ship was driven ashore near "Quitta". She was on a voyage from Africa to London.
St. Spiridone	Greece	The brig foundered in the Atlantic Ocean 70 nautical miles (130 km) east north east of Ouessant, Finistère, France. Her crew were rescued by the brig Water Kelpie (United Kingdom). St. Spiridone was on a voyage from Cardiff, Glamorgan, United Kingdom to Malta.
Sutton Bridge	United Kingdom	The brig was abandoned in Grand Metis Bay. She was on a voyage from Quebec City to Wisbech, Cambridgeshire. She was later taken in to a place of safety.
Sylph	(United Kingdom of Great Britain and Ireland) British North America	The schooner was driven ashore at Saint-André, Province of Canada. She was on a voyage from Quebec City to Dalhousie, New Brunswick.
Unity	United Kingdom	The schooner was driven ashore on Goose island, Province of Canada.
Vincent	United Kingdom	The schooner was driven ashore at Saint-André. She was on a voyage from Quebec City to Carraquette.
Woolsington	United Kingdom	The ship was foundered in the Atlantic Ocean before 9 November. Her crew survived. She was on a voyage from South Shields, County Durham to Cádiz, Spain.
Zitella	Duchy of Holstein	The ship was driven ashore in the Eider. She was on a voyage from Hull, Yorkshire, United Kingdom to Tønning. She was refloated and taken in to Tønning, where she arrived on 19 November in a severely damaged condition.
