= PS Sea Nymph =

History
- Name: 1845–1876: PS Sea Nymph
- Owner: 1845–1854: North West of Ireland Union Steam Company, Derry; 1854–1856: Belfast Steamship Company; 1856–1859: Chester and Holyhead Railway; 1859–1876: London and North Western Railway
- Operator: 1845–1854: North West of Ireland Union Steam Company, Derry; 1854–1856: Belfast Steamship Company; 1856–1859: Chester and Holyhead Railway; 1859–1876: London and North Western Railway
- Port of registry: (United Kingdom)
- Builder: Caird & Company, Greenock
- Yard number: 8
- Launched: 22 March 1845
- Out of service: 1876
- Fate: Broken up at Birkenhead.

General characteristics
- Tonnage: 685 gross register tons (GRT)
- Length: 206 ft (63 m)
- Beam: 28.8 ft (8.8 m)

PS Sea Nymph was a paddle steamer passenger vessel operated by the London and North Western Railway from 1856 to 1876.

== History ==
She was built by Caird & Company of Greenock for the North West of Ireland Union Steam Company and launched on 22 March 1845. On 25 May 1846, she collided with PS Ranger in the River Mersey. Twenty-one people were killed and Sea Nymph was severely damaged. In 1854, she was sold to the Belfast Steamship Company, and in 1856 passed to the Chester and Holyhead Railway, whose ships were taken over by the London and North Western Railway in 1859. She was sold to W E Clayton, Birkenhead in 1875.

She was scrapped in Birkenhead in 1876.
