= Chester and Holyhead Railway =

Railway company in England and Wales

The Chester and Holyhead Railway was an early railway company conceived to improve transmission of government dispatches between London and Ireland, as well as ordinary railway objectives. Its construction was hugely expensive, chiefly due to the cost of building the Britannia Tubular Bridge over the Menai Strait. The company had relied on Government support in facilitating the ferry service, and this proved to be uncertain. The company opened its main line throughout in 1850. It relied on the co-operation of other railways to reach London, and in 1859 it was absorbed by the London and North Western Railway.

There were extensive mineral deposits at a number of locations south of the C&HR main line, and the C&HR and the LNWR encouraged the building of branch lines to serve them. Llandudno was an early centre of leisure and holiday travel, and in the last decades of the nineteenth century, that traffic became increasingly important. In the twentieth century, the North Wales coast became a popular holiday destination, reached largely by rail travel.

In 1970, the Britannia Tubular Bridge suffered a serious fire, and the line was closed at that point until 1972 when a new structure at the same site was brought into use.

The container traffic at Holyhead has ceased, and passenger connections to the Irish ferries are much reduced, but the entire original main line is still in use for passenger traffic, together with the Llandudno branch and the Conwy Valley line to Blaenau Ffestiniog.

== Communication with Dublin ==
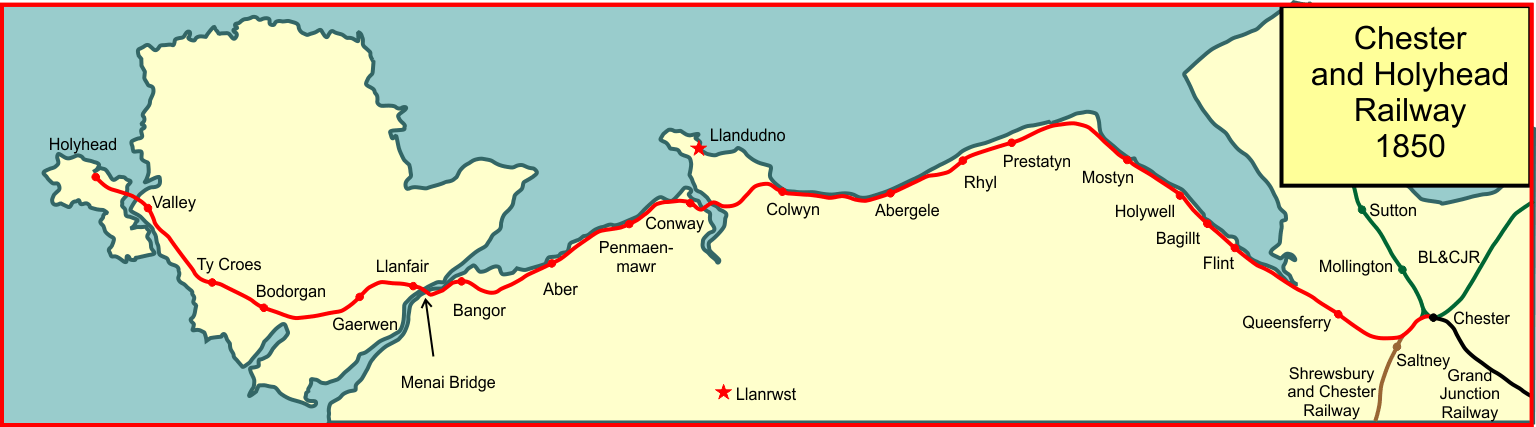
The Chester and Holyhead Railway in 1850

In 1800 acts of the United Kingdom and Irish parliaments determined the union of the two countries; this took effect on 1 January 1801. Prior to that time, the countries had been in personal union, having a shared sovereign but independent governments.

There had long been a necessity for convenient communication between London and Dublin, and the union gave further emphasis to the need, specifically for government mails. The sea crossing of the Irish Sea was difficult because of the poor harbour facilities on both sides, and the road approach to the harbour at Holyhead, Wales was long and difficult. In 1815 Thomas Telford was commissioned to build an improved road between London and Holyhead, and also between Lancashire and Holyhead. The A5 road as it existed in the 1950s shares much of the heritage of Telford's London to Holyhead route. Telford's road was completed from Shrewsbury to Bangor in 1819, and across Anglesey in 1828, including the Stanley Embankment from Anglesey to Holy Island.

The London route avoided Conway, crossing the River Conwy at Betws-y-Coed, but the Lancashire route required to cross the river, and both routes needed to cross the Menai Strait. Telford built bridges for these crossings. The Conwy Bridge and the Menai Bridge were both completed in 1826. As part of the same project, Holyhead Harbour was substantially improved in 1821, and subsequently extended and further improved in 1831 and 1847.

Although other routes to Ireland were used (Liverpool in particular), Holyhead was now the obvious, and easiest, port of access. On the Irish side, Howth Harbour, north of Dublin had been used, but increasingly the small harbour at Dún Laoghaire south of the city was used; it had been renamed Kingstown in 1821 in honour of a visit by King George IV. (Note: Its name reverted to Dún Laoghaire in 1921.)

The stagecoach transit from London to Holyhead had been 45 hours, and was now cut to 36 hours, and by 1832 to 28 hours. However, in 1838 there was through railway connection from London to Liverpool (over the London and Birmingham Railway, the Grand Junction Railway, and the Liverpool and Manchester Railway) transforming the land journey time on the British side. The Post Office, and the Admiralty, responsible at that time for operating the packet boats, transferred the main part of the traffic to Liverpool.

== Route to the port ==
A number of railway schemes were proposed to reach a harbour, many of them with major practical disadvantages. Late in 1836 a commission was appointed to determine the best route, and Charles Blacker Vignoles became the Engineer to the commission. The preliminary findings of the commission were ambiguous and did not result in a clear proposal for a railway.

Domestic railways progressed, however, and in September and October 1840 the Chester and Birkenhead Railway and the Chester and Crewe Railway respectively opened. They connected to the Grand Junction Railway, and a railway network was taking shape. A number of schemes to reach a North Wales port were put forward; the Menai would be crossed using Telford's Menai (road) bridge, hauling coaches and wagons across by ropes. When there was talk of a second, railway, bridge, the poor state of the money market frightened off promoters.

== Authorisation ==
Chester and Holyhead Railway Act 1844
- Act of Parliament
- Parliament of the United Kingdom
- Long title: An Act for making a Railway from Chester to Holyhead.
- Citation: 7 & 8 Vict. c. lxv
- Territorial extent: United Kingdom

Dates
- Royal assent: 4 July 1844
- Commencement: 4 July 1844 (Note: The Acts of Parliament (Commencement) Act 1793.)
Other legislation
Amended by	Statute Law (Repeals) Act 1981

Status: Amended

In January 1840, the commissioners were still considering the matter, and were given strong advice that Holyhead was the only suitable North Wales harbour, and that a line there from Chester was the best option. Nonetheless, the matter was still not settled, and railway use of the Menai road bridge was still being considered. The prevarication, and suggestions of other routes, continued; but in the 1844 session of Parliament a Chester and Holyhead Railway was proposed by Robert Grosvenor, MP for Chester, and William O. Stanley, MP for Anglesey. On 4 July 1844 the Chester and Holyhead Railway Act 1844 (7 & 8 Vict. c. lxv) obtained royal assent. The line was to be 85 miles long; authorised capital was £2.1 million.

The approval excluded the crossing of the Menai while allowing the main sections to be started. The London and Birmingham Railway was permitted to subscribe £1 million of the authorised capital. After some hesitation, the L&BR took up the subscription, apparently motivated by the nascent South Wales Railway, which it feared might be a competitor.

A significant financial issue was the government mail contract, and there was unsavoury horse trading with senior government representatives. Just before passage of the authorising bill, the directors responded to a government suggestion to operate the railway by atmospheric traction. Robert Stephenson investigated and advised against it, and the idea was dropped.

== Construction and opening ==
Work started on 1 May 1845.

The North Wales Mineral Railway had obtained parliamentary authority to build a line from a junction with the C&HR line at Saltney, near Chester, to Ruabon. By late 1846, the NWMR line was ready; the company had amalgamated with the Shrewsbury, Oswestry and Chester Railway to form the Shrewsbury and Chester Railway. Relying on the C&HR for final access to Chester, it requested that company to make the short section into Chester available, and on 4 November 1846 S&CR operation started.

The Chester station was to be joint with the Shrewsbury and Chester Railway and the other railways: the Chester and Birkenhead Railway (opened 30 September 1841), the Chester and Crewe Railway (opened 1 October 1840 and already absorbed into the Grand Junction Railway).

The station design was modified to be a joint station to accommodate all the traffic. Authorisation of construction of the station was by the Shrewsbury and Chester Railway Act 1847 (10 & 11 Vict. c. ccliv), of 9 July. The station was opened, although not quite finished, on 1 August 1848.

The works on the line were always expected to be difficult, and progress was slow. In 1848, it was decided to open from Chester to Bangor. Captain Wynne of the Board of Trade visited for the required inspection for passenger opening, on 19 and 20 April 1848. He inspected the line as far as the Conway, his colleague Captain J. L. A. Simmons inspected the line westward from there. The inspectors were informed that the line would be worked by the London and North Western Railway.

By the London and North Western Railway Act 1846 (9 & 10 Vict. c. cciv) of 16 July 1846 the London and Birmingham Railway, the Grand Junction Railway and the Manchester and Birmingham Railway merged to form the London and North Western Railway.

== The Menai Bridge ==
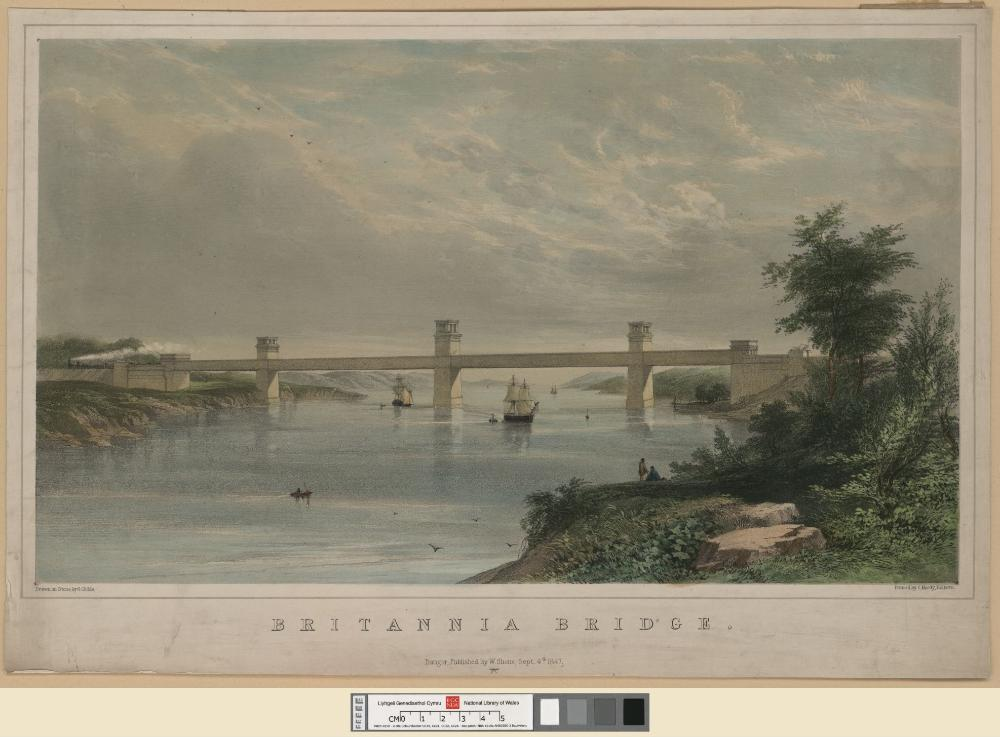
The Britannia Bridge (George Childs)

In the 1845 session of Parliament, the company deposited plans for the crossing of the Menai. The geographical route was now clear enough, but the concept of the bridge design was not. Such a large span lent itself to the idea of a suspension bridge, and Stephenson considered whether the deck of such a structure could be stiffened so as to carry the concentrated loads of a railway train, but decided against it. Any arched design was objected to by the supposed restriction on navigation it might impose. Stephenson was beginning to think of a bridge structure in the form of a straight tube; the unusual depth of the beam would give sufficient bending strength. John Laird, a shipbuilder and C&HR board member, told Stephenson of the case of the launch of a steamship, the Prince of Wales. The launch went astray, and the ship ended up supported on ground at bow and stern, over a length of 180 feet, acting as a beam without distress.

Chester and Holyhead Railway Act 1845
- Act of Parliament
- Parliament of the United Kingdom
- Long title: An Act for completing the Line of the Chester and Holyhead Railway, and for amending the Act relating to the said Railway.
- Citation: 8 & 9 Vict. c. xxxiii

Dates
- Royal assent: 30 June 1845

In the parliamentary process, Stephenson was naturally challenged as to the feasibility of his tubular bridge, but succeeded in convincing sceptical members, and the Chester and Holyhead Railway Act 1845 (8 & 9 Vict. c. xxxiii) received royal assent on 30 June 1845.

After some experimentation, rectangular tubes (as opposed to circular or elliptical) were decided on, and a one-sixth scale model was tested to destruction. This gave Stephenson confidence in the concept, and auxiliary support chains earlier thought necessary were dispensed with. The erection would be performed by hydraulic jacks.

== Dee bridge failure ==
A bridge over the River Dee near Chester was already in use. As it was in the section of route used by the Shrewsbury and Chester Railway, trains had been using it since November 1846. It used cast iron beams supported by wrought iron ties in a composite structure. The weakness of cast iron in tension was well understood, and the ties were present to overcome that difficulty. The main beams were formed of three units bolted together end-to-end, and trussed by the wrought iron ties. The track was supported by oak decking timbers laid on the bottom flange of the main beams.

On 24 May 1847, one of the spans failed as a passenger train was crossing at 30 miles per hour (48 km/h). Six people were killed. The engine successfully crossed the bridge, but the progressive failure led to the bridge collapsing under the tender and following coaches. The probable cause is nowadays considered to be fatigue tension fracture of the beams, provoked by asymmetric loading by the deck timbers, a stress-raising feature in the profile of the beams, and relaxation of the tie bars, transferring nearly all the load to the cast beams alone. A painter had been working on a girder which cracked before the accident, and he actually measured a very large deflection of five and a half inches at the centre of the span when a train was passing.

== Conwy bridge ==
While the parliamentary attention had been on the Menai crossing, the Conwy bridge (at the time spelt Conway) was to be erected first. Stephenson took up temporary residence at the site from 12 February 1848. On 6 March, the tubes were floated into position ready for raising. By 18 April, Stephenson was able to drive a demonstration train over the bridge. Public traffic over the bridge started on 1 May 1848.

== Opening on Anglesey ==
The line from Llanfair to Holyhead was opened to public traffic on 1 August 1848. As the Menai crossing was not yet ready, passengers and goods were conveyed across by coach and carts respectively. The Holyhead station was more than a mile from the pier, and the line was extended to reach it much later, in 1851.

== Financial difficulties ==
At this period the company found itself considerably overstretched financially, at a time when the money market was unfavourable to the raising of additional funds. The problem was severe, but was overcome when the London and North Western Railway agreed to take preference shares and contractors were paid in company debentures.

== Britannia bridge and opening of the line ==
The Menai bridge was to have two main spans each with twin tubes (for double track), and the tubes were to be 406 feet in length. The central pier was to be 221 feet high. Work started at the site in July 1847, and by November 1848 fabrication of the main tubes was substantially completed. From 19 June 1849 the tubes for one line of track were floated into position and raised by jacks; the process was completed for the four main tubes by 7 January 1850. On 5 March 1850, Stephenson drove a test train through the completed single-track span of the bridge, and on 18 March 1850 public passenger trains started running. The Chester and Holyhead main line was connected throughout.

At a half-yearly shareholders' meeting in March 1850, it was stated that the bridge had cost £674,000, three times Stephenson's estimate.

From April 1850 work was started on the structure for the second track. The final lift of the last main tube took place on 16 August 1850. On 19 October 1850, trains started using the second track in the bridge, and the full public operation started on 21 August.

== Operating, the mail contract and steamers ==
The directors had always assumed that they would be awarded the mail contract on the opening of the line, and that this would include operating the mail packet boat service. Towards the end of 1846, the company tried to start negotiation with the government and were curtly rebuffed. Moreover, the City of Dublin Steam Packet Company and other private operators objected to the powers to run steamships sought by the company in the 1847 parliamentary session. The situation was exceedingly paradoxical, because the government was financing improvements to the Holyhead harbour, and to the company's steamers were using it, but the company were forbidden from operating them.

Chester and Holyhead Railway Act 1848
- Act of Parliament
- Parliament of the United Kingdom
- Long title: An Act to enable the Chester and Holyhead Railway Company to purchase, hire, and use Steam Boats; and for other Purposes.
- Citation: 11 & 12 Vict. c. lx

Dates
- Royal assent: 22 July 1848

Text of statute as originally enacted

This seemed to be put right in the 1848 session, when the Chester and Holyhead Railway Act 1848 (11 & 12 Vict. c. lx) of 22 July 1848 authorised the use of steamboats, and also the increased capital to the extent of £250,000. The company had originally intended to operate its trains itself, but on reflection a working arrangement with the LNWR seemed better, and agreement on this was reached in August 1847.

The government once again dealt harshly with the company over the mail contract, requiring them to take over the Admiralty steamers (even though they knew the company had ordered their own). A sequence of threatened withdrawals of co-operation followed; at the same time the C&HR's financial position deteriorated steeply, and the board seemed to be at loggerheads. In August 1849, the company were promised £100,000 by the LNWR, which was desperately needed, but the LNWR realised they had no powers to make such a loan.

== 1850 timetable ==
Bradshaw's Guide for March 1850 shows a brisk passenger service on the line: passengers could leave Kingstown at 19:30 Dublin time (19:55 GMT) and Holyhead at 01:35 by mail train; the time between Llanfair and Bangor was 35 minutes, although the traveller was not informed that this was by road vehicle; the onward journey arrived at Chester at 04:40 and arrival in London was at 13:00. Three other services traversed the whole line, one on Sundays, and two to London and two only on the line respectively on Sundays.

== Financial problems ==
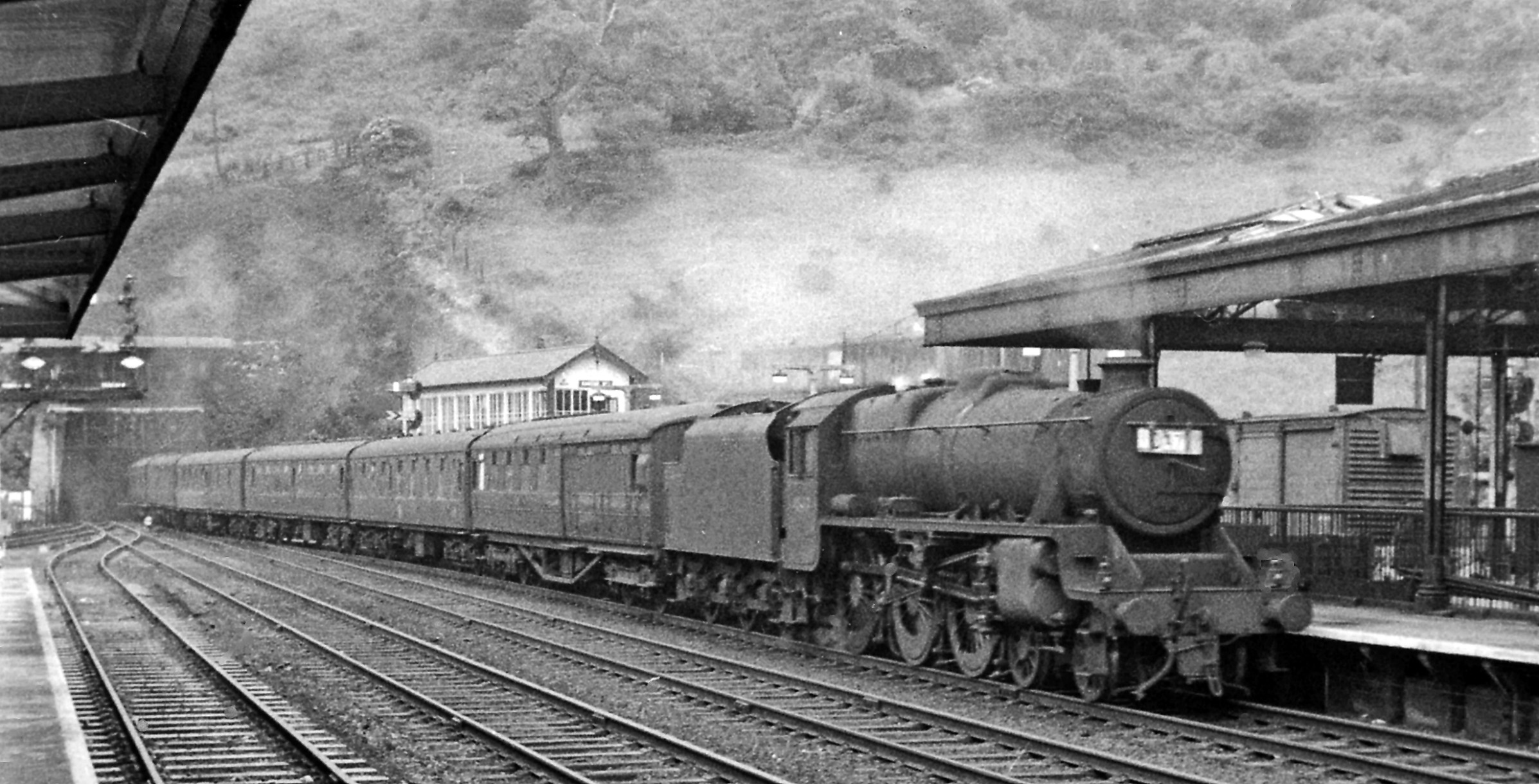
Bangor station, Gwynedd in the 1950s

The LNWR offered at length an advance of £250,000 to finish the works and lease the railway. The arrangement was to last seven years, and the LNWR guaranteed 4% on the debentures. However the lease needed parliamentary authorisation, and the GWR made it clear it would demand running powers, which frightened the LNWR off. Now Samuel Peto joined the board and personally funded debenture payments that the C&HR was otherwise unable to meet. He was elected Chairman on 12 February 1851. Peto's impeccable record resulted in renewed confidence in the money markets, and preference shares were suddenly oversubscribed.

Nevertheless, it was only in the half-year ending 31 December 1854 that the company made a net profit, and this allowed a small dividend on the first preference shares only. The financial position of the company was one of continuing indebtedness, in fact dependency on the LNWR, and the LNWR decided that the time had come to bring the matter to a head. The C&HR would be worked as part of the LNWR system, paying the C&HR shareholders 1% above its own working expenses rate after an initial period. The arrangement was to start on 1 July 1856.

Full acquisition of the C&HR was now inevitable, but the C&HR needed to negotiate renewal of the steamer service and the mail contract. The contract would have onerous obligations and heavy penalties at a time when actual operation was dependent on the goodwill of the LNWR, and the C&HR forbore to complete the agreement.

Chester and Holyhead Railway Act 1858
- Act of Parliament
- Parliament of the United Kingdom
- Long title: An Act to authorize Arrangements between the Chester and Holyhead Railway Company and London and North-western Railway Company, and to authorize the Chester and Holyhead Railway Company to raise a further Sum of Money; and for other Purposes.
- Citation: 21 & 22 Vict. c. cxxx

Dates
- Royal assent: 23 July 1858

The Chester and Holyhead Railway Act 1858 (21 & 22 Vict. c. cxxx) of 23 July 1858 allowed the financial support of the C&HR by the LNWR and enabled contractual arrangements, but did not require them. Activation of these clauses would allow running powers for competing companies, and the LNWR declined to enter into that, leaving the C&HR still in suspense. The C&HR decided to apply for powers to merge with any other company whatever, and this finally forced the LNWR's hand into full amalgamation. This took effect on 1 January 1859. The Chester and Holyhead Railway Company remained in existence until it was dissolved by the London and North-western Railway (Additional Powers) Act 1879 (42 & 43 Vict. c. cxlii) of 21 July 1879.

=== Mold branch ===
In the first half of the nineteenth century, Mold was an important commercial centre, with considerable mineral deposits. Businesspeople there sought a railway connection, and the Mold Railway was incorporated on 9 July 1847. It was to run from a junction near Saltney to Mold, with a branch line to Ffrith. The main line of the Mold Railway opened on 14 August 1849; it was worked by the LNWR. In 1852, responsibility was transferred to the C&HR and the LNWR.

== Holyhead extension ==
The line was extended to the Admiralty Pier at Holyhead on 20 May 1851, and a new general station was opened on 14 September 1851.

== Caernarvon branch ==
The Bangor and Carnarvon Railway was incorporated by the Bangor and Caernarvon Railway Act 1851 (14 & 15 Vict. c. xxi) on 20 May 1851. The line was leased to the Chester and Holyhead Railway from the time of opening, the C&HR in turn being worked by the LNWR. Freight and passenger traffic between Bangor and Port Dinorwic commenced on 1 March and 10 March 1852 respectively.

== Llandudno branch ==
On 20 August 1853, a branch to Llandudno was authorised by the St. George's Harbour Act 1853 (16 & 17 Vict. c. ccxiii). At one time Llandudno, or rather Ormes Bay, had been considered as the departure harbour for Dublin, but as stated Holyhead had overtaken that. Tourism would, it was thought, support the branch. Originally it was intended to join the main line at Conway, facing Holyhead, but it was realised that the available space there prevented that, and the point of junction was placed east of the Conwy river, at what became Llandudno Junction.

The branch opened on 1 October 1858. It was worked by the LNWR, and leased to that company in 1862, and vested in the LNWR by the London and North-western Railway (New Works and Additional Powers) Act 1873 (36 & 37 Vict. c. cci) of 28 July 1873.

== Denbigh branch ==
The Vale of Clwyd Railway was authorised by the Vale of Clwyd Railway Act 1856 (19 & 20 Vict. c. xlv) on 23 June 1856. It was to run from a junction with the C&HR at Foryd Junction, not far from Rhyl, to Denbigh. It opened using a temporary station at Denbigh on 22 September 1858. For the time being the C&HR, shortly to be taken over by the LNWR, allowed access to their Rhyl station.

The LNWR took over the working of the line by the London and North Western Railway (Additional Powers) Act 1864 (27 & 28 Vict. c. ccxxvi), and the company was amalgamated with the LNWR by the London and North Western Railway (New Works and Additional Powers) Act 1867 (30 & 31 Vict. c. cxliv) of 15 July 1867.

== Later branches ==
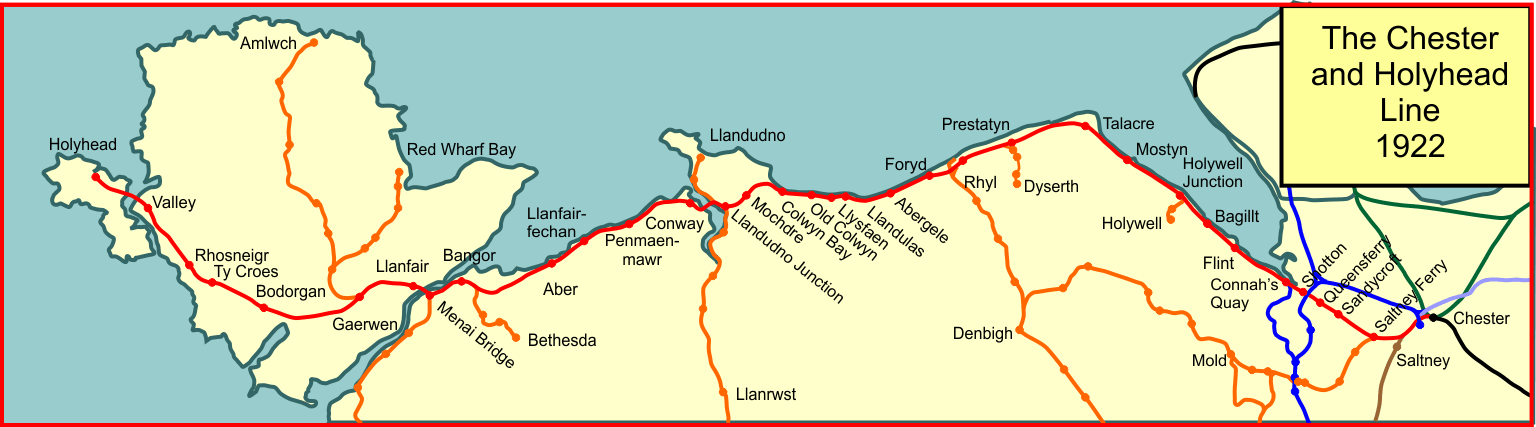
The Chester and Holyhead Railway and connecting lines in 1922

After the absorption of the Chester and Holyhead Railway by the LNWR in 1859, more branches connecting the line were built:

=== Conway Valley ===
In the mid-nineteenth-century, Llanrwst was an important market town, and a branch to it from the main line had been contemplated for some time. The LNWR promoted the Conway and Llanrwst Railway was authorised by the Conway and Llanrwst Railway Act 1860 (23 & 24 Vict. c. cxlix) on 23 July 1860, and opened to the public on 17 June 1863. In 1868, with the growth of tourism, the line was extended to Betws-y-Coed

At this time, the slate industry was expanding massively above Betws-y-Coed, at Blaenau Ffestiniog. Although other railway connections existed there, the LNWR decided to extend the branch to reach it. The result was the Bettws Extension Railway; this involved a long tunnel bored through hard rock at considerable expense, which opened in 1879.

=== Amlwch branch ===
After some false starts, a branch railway into Anglesey was authorised: the Anglesey Central Railway was authorised by the Anglesey Central Railway Act 1863 (26 & 27 Vict. c. cxxviii) on 13 July 1863. They had approached the LNWR to work their line, but had been rebuffed. A passenger service started from Gaerwen to Llangefni on 12 March 1865, worked by the LNWR, who had relented. The line was extended to Llannerch-y-medd on 1 February 1866, and throughout to Amlwch on 3 June 1867. The final section may have been opened to goods traffic earlier, on 10 September 1866.

The line was acquired by the LNWR in 1876.

=== Dyserth branch ===
There were lead and iron ore deposits at Dyserth, a few miles south of the C&HR main line. The LNWR obtained powers to build from Prestatyn to Dyserth by the London and North-western Railway (New Lines) Act 1866 (29 & 30 Vict. c. clxviii) of 16 July 1866. The line was known as the Prestatyn and Cwm Line, and was opened for goods traffic on 1 September 1869.

Dyserth Castle and Cwm Waterfalls were considered to be tourist attractions, and a steam railmotor service operated passenger services from 28 August 1905.

=== Holywell branch ===
A localised combination of high quality minerals near Holywell had led to an intensive local industry, and on 29 July 1864 the Holywell Railway was authorised to make a short branch, upgrading an earlier Holywell Limestone Company tramway, which crossed the C&HR main line on the level. The new line would make a bridge crossing, and have gradients of 1 in 27.

It opened for mineral traffic in June 1867, but became disused and derelict some time in the following decade. The LNWR purchased it in 1891, but for the time being did nothing with it. In an inversion of the motivation elsewhere, the growth of passenger omnibus traffic encouraged the LNWR to reopen the line to passenger traffic. The London and North Western Railway Act 1906 (6 Edw. 7. c. lxxiii) and the London and North Western Railway Act 1907 (7 Edw. 7. c. lxxxvii) authorised this, and on 1 July 1912, the resurgent line opened, with a new curve connecting to the main line. The short line was a considerable success, but after World War II decline intervened and it closed on 6 September 1954, except for a stub to Crescent Siding textile mills, which finally closed on 11 August 1957.

=== Wrexham, Mold and Connah's Quay Railway ===
The Buckley Railway – in fact a tramway – had conveyed mineral products to a wharf at Connah's quay on the River Dee, since 1862.

It was superseded by the Wrexham, Mold and Connah's Quay Railway, which upgraded the line to a locomotive railway, opening in 1866. The WM&CQR ran to the Buckley Railway wharf at Connah's Quay, but also made a connection with the C&HR main line near there, and this proved more useful, for interchange traffic, than was expected.

The WM&CQR never transferred into LNWR ownership; it suffered terribly from lack of money, and it was the Great Central Railway that acquired it, rescuing it from bankruptcy. The acquisition took effect on 1 January 1905.

=== Bethesda branch ===
There were important and extensive slate quarries in the Penrhyn Estate south of Bethesda, near Bangor. In 1801, a narrow gauge tramway was constructed to convey the mineral to Port Penrhyn a mile east of Bangor. In 1879, the tramway was upgraded to allow steam locomotives to run on it, and was renamed the Penrhyn Quarry Railway. The slate traffic increased, and the LNWR proposed a branch line to the quarry. The line opened on 1884 to passenger trains and 1885 to mineral trains, though it terminated at Bethesda, about a mile from the quarry. Gradients were steep, at 1 in 40. Road competition led to closure of the passenger service in 1951, and the mineral traffic ceased in 1963.

== Llandudno Junction alterations ==
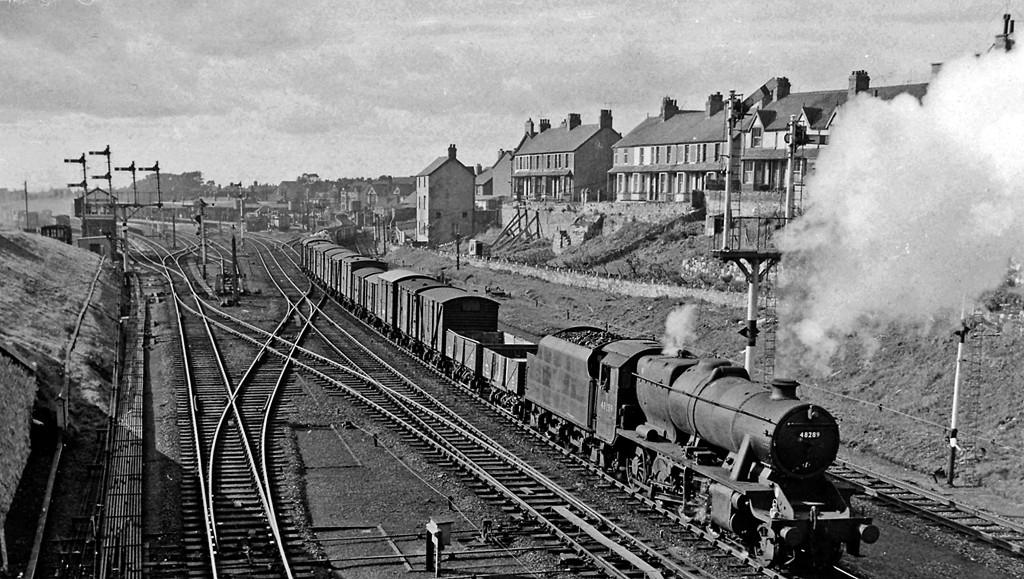
Llandudno Junction in the 1950s

By the late nineteenth century, the original junction layout at Llandudno Junction was becoming impossibly cramped. The station was enlarged, and the junction of the Conway Valley line with the main line was moved east to accommodate that. The new arrangement was commissioned on 1 October 1897.

== Traffic ==
When the line was built, the dominant business was expected to be the Irish mail. Gardner, writing in 1938, said:

Nevertheless the traffic on the... line has grown to enormous proportions, but for reasons very different from those foreseen in 1848. The growth of the seaside holiday resorts of Rhyl, Colwyn Bay, and of Llandudno, and later of many smaller places, stretching from Prestatyn in Flintshire to Portmadoc on Cardigan Bay, has made the old Chester & Holyhead one of the busiest holiday lines in Britain.

The 1938 Bradshaw shows an extraordinary number of trains on the line: on summer Saturdays 78 long-distance trains passed Chester (not all making a call there) on to the line, together with 24 local or stopping trains. Most of the long-distance trains came from the north Midlands, Lancashire and Yorkshire.

Gardner made the observation that "Holyhead... has not developed as a [general] port, and its activities are now confined to the traffic to and from Ireland. Even this has declined during the present century..."

== Britannia bridge fire ==
On the night of 23 May 1970, a fire took hold in the Britannia Bridge. The fire was very severe, and so intense that the main tubes buckled and were unusable. The line had to be closed at that point. A new bridge superstructure was designed, capable of carrying rail and road traffic on separate levels; it was a braced arch structure, using the original foundations. The crossing was reopened to rail traffic on 30 January 1972, and to road traffic in 1980.

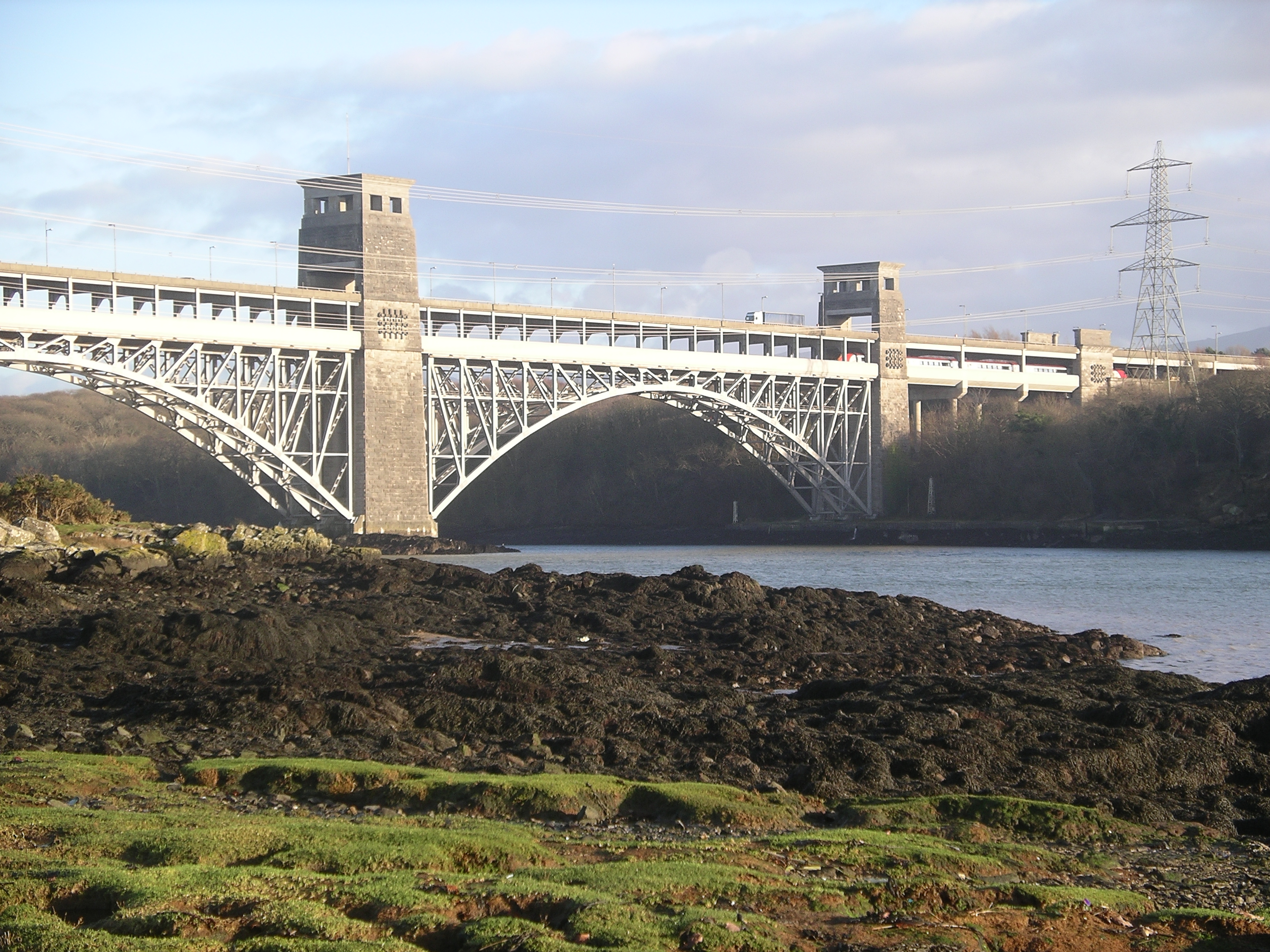
Britannia Bridge after reconstruction

The branch line to Caernarfon had been closed on 4 August 1969, but during the rail closure of the Britannia bridge, part of the former branch was reopened from 15 June 1970, to enable Irish container traffic to be loaded and unloaded from rail while Holyhead was inaccessible. The reopened section was once again closed on 5 February 1972 when the rail connection to Holyhead was restored.

== Branch line decline ==
Many of the branch lines of the Holyhead main line were dependent on Victorian and Edwardian tourism, minerals or agriculture, and as these became better served by road transport, so the branches lost custom. Against the trend, Llandudno continues as a popular tourist centre, and the branch line to Blaenau Ffestiniog has been retained as a passenger route, although the slate extraction business is nowadays insignificant. The WM&CQR connection too has long been removed (in 1954).

The Amlwch branch closed to passengers in 1964, and completely in 1993. The Caernarfon line was closed to passengers in 1970, and completely after the temporary reopening, in 1972. The Bethesda line closed to passengers in 1951, but goods traffic continued until 1963. The Rhyl to Denbigh line lost its passenger service in 1955, and closed in 1961, and the Dyserth line closed to passengers in 1930, and completely in 1973. The Holywell line lost its passenger trains in 1954.

== The present day ==
The former Chester and Holyhead main line continues as an important secondary main line. The connection with Irish ferry services at Holyhead has been retained, but has lost much of its former significance, but ordinary intercity and local passenger traffic is buoyant. There are (summer 2019) forty daily passenger trains each way on some or all of the main line.

There is no reference to rail freight on the Holyhead Port Authority website; the Freightliner terminal ceased operation in 1991. There is minimal freight activity on the entire route.

== Location list ==
- Holyhead Admiralty Pier; opened 20 May 1851; closed 1 April 1925;
- Holyhead; opened 1 August 1848; relocated 15 May 1851; relocated again 1 January 1866; still open;
- Valley; opened June 1849; closed 14 February 1966; reopened 15 March 1982; still open;
- Rhosneigr; opened 1 May 1907; closed 1 January 1917; reopened 1 February 1919; still open;
- Ty Croes; opened November 1848; still open;
- Bodorgan; opened May 1849; still open;
- Gaerwen; opened January 1849; closed 14 February 1966; convergence of Amlwch line 1865–1993;
- Llanfair; opened 1 August 1848; closed 14 February 1966; reopened 29 May 1970; closed 31 January 1972; reopened as Llanfairpwll 7 May 1973; still open;
- Britannia Bridge; opened July 1851; closed 1 October 1858;
- Menai Bridge; opened 1 October 1858; closed 14 February 1966; convergence of Caernarvon line 1852–1972;
- Bangor; opened 1 May 1848; still open;
- Bethesda Junction; convergence of Bethesda branch 1884–1953;
- Aber; opened 1 May 1848; closed 12 September 1960;
- Llanfairfechan; opened May 1860; still open;
- Penmaenmawr; opened November 1849; still open;
- Conway; opened 1 May 1848; closed 14 February 1966; reopened as Conwy; opened 29 June 1987; still open;
- Llandudno Junction; opened 1 October 1858; relocated on deviation line 1 November 1897; still open; convergence of Llandudno branch from 1858; divergence of Llanrwst line from 1863;
- Mochdre & Pabo; opened 1 April 1889; closed 1 January 1917; reopened 5 May 1919; closed 5 January 1931;
- Colwyn; opened October 1849; renamed Colwyn Bay 1876; still open;
- Colwyn; opened May 1884; renamed Old Colwyn 1885; closed 1 December 1952;
- Llandulas; opened 1 August 1862; renamed Llysfaen 1889; closed 5 January 1931;
- Llandulas; opened 1 July 1889; closed 1 December 1952;
- Abergele; opened 1 May 1848; still open;
- Foryd; opened 20 April 1885; closed 2 July 1917; reopened 1 July 1919; closed 1931; reopened as Kinmel Bay 4 July 1938 for summer service only; closed 2 September 1939;
- Foryd Junction; convergence of Vale of Clwyd Railway 1858–1968;
- Rhyl; opened 1 May 1848; still open;
- Dyserth Junction; divergence of Dyserth branch 1869–1930;
- Prestatyn; opened 1 May 1848; relocated to west 28 February 1897; still open;
- Talacre; opened 1 May 1903; closed 14 February 1966;
- Mostyn; opened 1 May 1848; closed 14 February 1966;
- Holywell; opened 1 May 1848; renamed Holywell Junction 1912; closed 14 February 1966; divergence of Holywell branch 1912–1957;
- Bagillt; opened January 1849; relocated 1871; closed 14 February 1966;
- Flint; opened 1 May 1848; still open;
- junction for WM&CQR 1862–1954;
- Connah's Quay; opened 1 September 1870; closed 14 February 1966;
- Shotton; opened 1 April 1907; renamed Shotton Low Level 1924; closed 14 February 1966; reopened as Shotton 21 August 1972;
- Queensferry; opened 1 May 1848; closed 14 February 1966;
- Sandycroft; opened 1 March 1884; closed 1 May 1961;
- Mold Junction; convergence of Mold Railway 1849–1970;
- Saltney Ferry; opened 1 January 1891; closed 30 April 1962;
- Saltney Junction; convergence of Shrewsbury and Chester Railway from 1846;
- triangle junctions for Birkenhead line;
- Chester (Joint station); sometimes known as Chester (General); still open.

== Chester and Holyhead Railway Company Ships ==
The company commissioned four new ships to operate between Holyhead and Dún Laoghaire. Later further ships were acquired. From 1861 the service moved to Dublin.

- PS Hibernia. Commissioned in 1847. Broken up in 1897.
- PS Scotia. Commissioned in 1847. Captured as a blockade runner in October 1862. Became the General Banks in 1863.
- PS Anglia. Commissioned in 1847. Captured as a blockade runner in October 1862. Became the Admiral Dupont in 1863.
- PS Cambria. Commissioned in 1848.
- PS Ocean, purchased in 1853. Built in 1836 for the St. George Steam Packet Company, and transferred to the Cork Steamship Company.
- PS Hercules, purchased in 1853. Built in 1838 for the St. George Steam Packet Company
- PS Queen, purchased in 1853. Built in 1838 by Tod & McGregor of Glasgow.Scrapped in 1862.
- PS Sea Nymph, purchased second hand in November 1856 from the Belfast Steamship Company
- PS Telegraph, purchased second hand in November 1856 from the Belfast Steamship Company

== See also ==
- Holyhead Breakwater
- Irish Mail
