= PS Hibernia =

Paddle steamer passenger vessel

History
- Name: 1847–1897: PS Hibernia
- Owner: 1847–1859: Chester and Holyhead Railway; 1859–1877: London and North Western Railway; 1877–1897: Waterford and Limerick Railway
- Operator: 1847–1859: Chester and Holyhead Railway; 1859–1877: London and North Western Railway; 1877–1897: Waterford and Limerick Railway
- Port of registry: (United Kingdom)
- Builder: Thomas Vernon, Liverpool
- Launched: 1847
- Out of service: 1897
- Fate: Sank on way for scrapping

General characteristics
- Tonnage: 573 gross register tons (GRT)
- Length: 197.3 ft (60.1 m)
- Beam: 25.6 ft (7.8 m)
- Draught: 14.1 ft (4.3 m)

PS Hibernia was a paddle steamer passenger vessel operated by the Chester and Holyhead Railway from 1847 to 1859 and the London and North Western Railway from 1859 to 1877.

== History ==
She was built by Thomas Vernon of Liverpool for the Chester and Holyhead Railway. On 27 September 1849, she towed the disabled Cambria in to Holyhead, Anglesey. Cambria had suffered a broken main shaft. On 1 October 1854, she assisted in the refloating of Ocean, which had run aground off Ringsend, County Dublin the next day. The Chester and Holyhead Railway was taken over by the London and North Western Railway in 1859.

She was sold to the Waterford and Limerick Railway in 1877 and used as a hulk until 1897. She foundered off the Smalls on 25 July 1897 on the way to the breaker's yard.
