= Cape Anguille, Newfoundland and Labrador =

Coordinates: 47°54′22″N 59°24′20″W

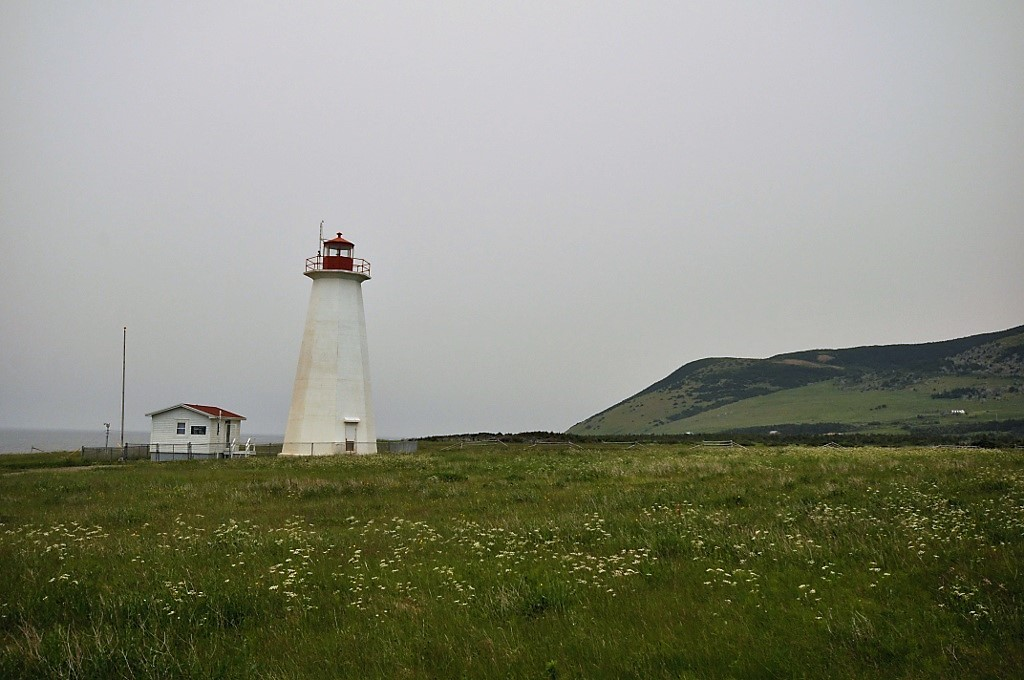
Cape Anguille Lighthouse

Cape Anguille (/ænˈɡwɪl/ an-GWIL) is a settlement in the south-west region of Newfoundland, Canada. It marks the south-western edge of the Anguille Mountains. The Cape Anguille Lighthouse is located in Cape Anguille.

The headland of Cape Anguille is the most western point of land of the island of Newfoundland.
