= PS Hercules =

History
- Name: 1838–1862: PS Hercules
- Owner: 1838–1853: St. George Steam Packet Company; 1853–1859: Chester and Holyhead Railway; 1859–1862: London and North Western Railway
- Operator: 1838–1853: St. George Steam Packet Company; 1853–1859: Chester and Holyhead Railway; 1859–1862: London and North Western Railway
- Port of registry: (United Kingdom)
- Builder: Mottishead and Hayes
- Launched: 1838
- Out of service: 1862
- Fate: Scrapped 1862

General characteristics
- Tonnage: 265 gross register tons (GRT)
- Length: 147.6 ft (45.0 m)
- Beam: 25.9 ft (7.9 m)
- Draught: 15.1 ft (4.6 m)

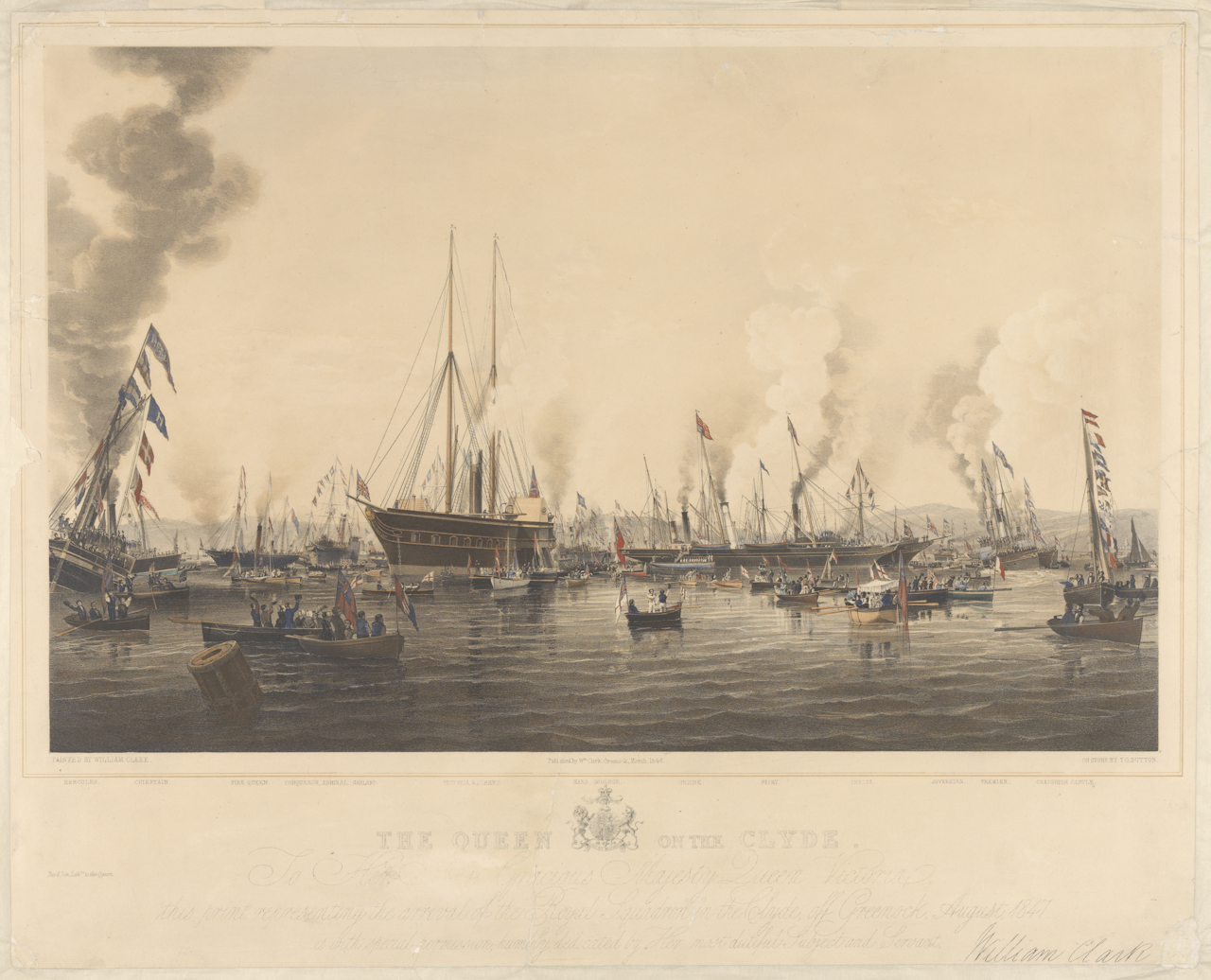
The Queen (Victoria) on the Clyde - the arrival of the Royal Squadron in the Clyde off Greenock, August 1847 - The Hercules is on the far left of the image

PS Hercules was a paddle steamer vessel operated by the St. George Steam Packet Company from 1836, and then the Chester and Holyhead Railway from 1853 to 1859 and the London and North Western Railway from 1859 to 1862.

== History ==
She was built in Liverpool for the St. George Steam Packet Company in 1838.

When acquired by the London and North Western Railway in 1859 she was something of a stop-gap until new ships could be built.

She was scrapped in 1862.
