= Anguille Mountains =

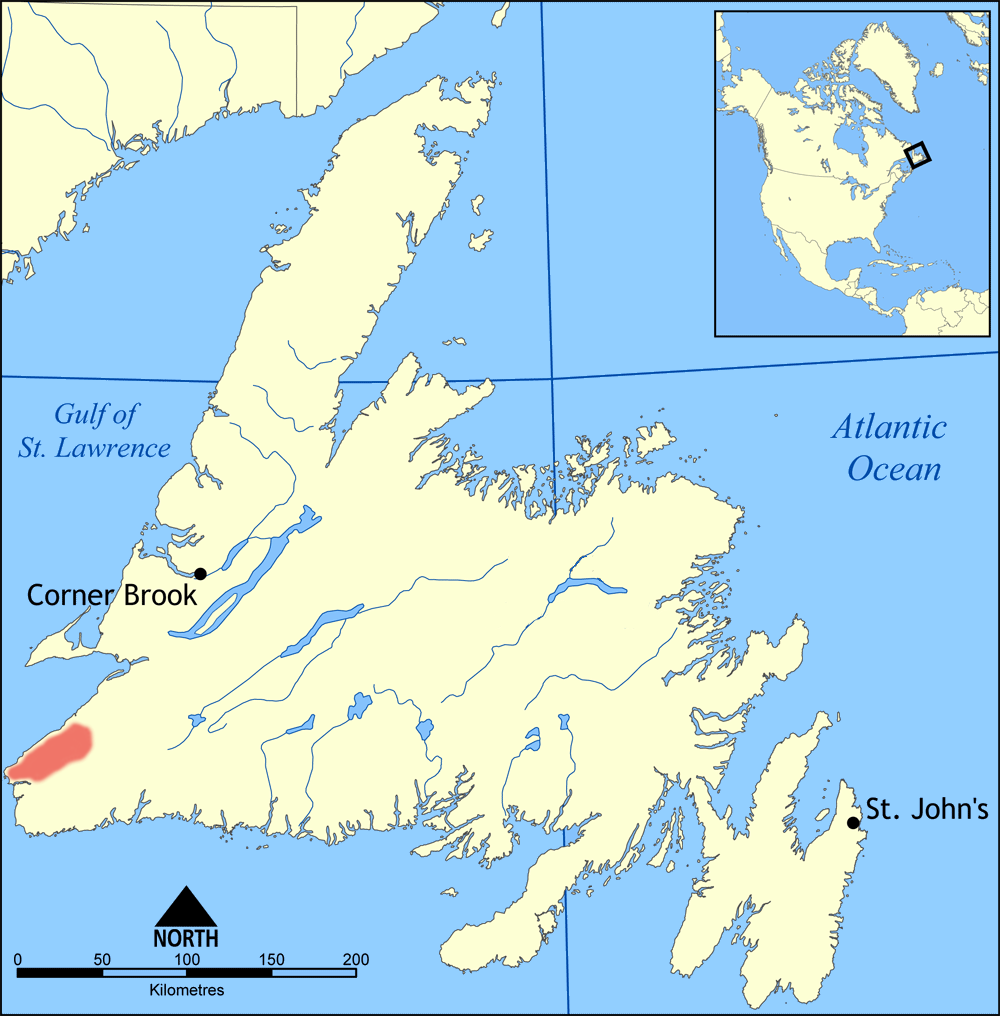
- The Anguille Mountains highlighted on the west coast of Newfoundland

Highest point
- Elevation: 454 m (1,490 ft)

Geography
- Country: Canada
- Province: Newfoundland
- Range coordinates: 48°00′00″N 59°10′57″W
- Parent range: Long Range Mountains (Appalachian Mountains)

The Anguille Mountains (/ænˈɡwɪl/ an-GWIL) are a section of the Long Range Mountains located on the west coast of the island of Newfoundland, Canada, along the Gulf of St. Lawrence.

Covering the first 64 km (40 mi) area from Cape Anguille along Bay St. George, the mountains are considered part of the Long Range Mountains which in turn are considered to be a section of the Appalachian Mountain system.
