= PS Ocean =

English paddle streamer

History
- Name: 1836–1862: PS Ocean
- Owner: 1836–1843: St. George Steam Packet Company; 1843–1853: Cork Steamship Company; 1853–1859: Chester and Holyhead Railway; 1859–1862: London and North Western Railway
- Operator: 1836–1843: St. George Steam Packet Company; 1843–1853: Cork Steamship Company; 1853–1859: Chester and Holyhead Railway; 1859–1862: London and North Western Railway
- Port of registry: (United Kingdom)
- Builder: Mottishead and Hayes, Liverpool
- Launched: 1836
- Out of service: 1862
- Fate: Scrapped 1862

General characteristics
- Tonnage: 507 gross register tons (GRT)
- Length: 154.7 ft (47.2 m)
- Beam: 22.6 ft (6.9 m)
- Draught: 15.4 ft (4.7 m)
- Speed: 16 knots

PS Ocean was a paddle steamer built for and operated by the St. George Steam Packet Company from 1836, then the Cork Steamship Company and then the Chester and Holyhead Railway from 1853 to 1859 and the London and North Western Railway from 1859 to 1862.

== History ==
She was built in Liverpool by Mottishead and Hayes for the St. George Steam Packet Company in 1836.

On 30 September 1854, Ocean ran aground off Ringsend, County Dublin. She was refloated the next day with assistance from Hibernia.

When acquired by the London and North Western Railway in 1859 she was something of a stop-gap until new ships could be built.

She was scrapped in 1862.
