= PS Telegraph =

History
- Name: 1853–1881: PS Telegraph
- Owner: 1853–1856: Belfast Steamship Company; 1856: Chester and Holyhead Railway; 1856–1874: London and North Western Railway; 1874–1881: C.E. Stewart, Chester
- Operator: 1853–1856: Belfast Steamship Company; 1856: Chester and Holyhead Railway; 1856–1874: London and North Western Railway; 1874–1881: C.E. Stewart, Chester
- Port of registry: (United Kingdom)
- Builder: J & G Thomson, Govan
- Yard number: 8
- Launched: 26 February 1853
- Out of service: 1881
- Fate: Scrapped.

General characteristics
- Tonnage: 820 gross register tons (GRT)
- Length: 241 ft (73 m)
- Beam: 27.5 ft (8.4 m)
- Draught: 15 ft (4.6 m)

PS Telegraph was a paddle steamer passenger vessel operated by the London and North Western Railway from 1859 to 1874.

== History ==
She was built by J & G Thomson of Govan for the Belfast Steamship Company, and in 1856 passed to the Chester and Holyhead Railway, which was taken over by the London and North Western Railway in 1859.

She ran aground on 27 January 1881 at Cooley Point, Ireland. She was salvaged but was beyond economical repair and scrapped in the same year.
