= PS Cambria =

History
- Name: 1848–1884: PS Cambria
- Owner: 1848–1859: Chester and Holyhead Railway; 1859–1861: London and North Western Railway
- Operator: 1848–1859: Chester and Holyhead Railway; 1859–1861: London and North Western Railway
- Port of registry: Holyhead, United Kingdom
- Builder: John Laird, Birkenhead
- Yard number: 68
- Launched: 1848
- Out of service: 1884
- Fate: Scrapped 1884

General characteristics
- Tonnage: 590 gross register tons (GRT)
- Length: 207.5 ft (63.2 m)
- Beam: 26.3 ft (8.0 m)
- Draught: 14.6 ft (4.5 m)

PS Cambria was a paddle steamer passenger vessel operated by the Chester and Holyhead Railway from 1848 to 1859 and the London and North Western Railway from 1859 to 1861.

== History ==
She was built by John Laird of Birkenhead for the Chester and Holyhead Railway. On 27 September 1849, she suffered a broken main shaft when 20 nautical miles (37 km) off Holyhead, Anglesey whilst on a voyage from Kingstown, County Dublin to Holyhead. Her passengers were taken off by HMS Banshee. She was towed in to Holyhead by Hibernia.

The Chester and Holyhead Railway was taken over by the London and North Western Railway in 1859. She was lengthened in 1861 to 244.4 ft (74.5 m). On 21 June 1873, Cambria ran into the steamship Duchess of Sutherland at Holyhead, severely damaging her. Cambria was scrapped in 1884.
