= Russian ship Imperatritsa Maria =

At least three ships of the Imperial Russian Navy had been named Imperatritsa Maria, after either the first Maria Feodorovna or second Maria Feodorovna:

- Russian ship Imperatritsa Maria (1827), an 84-gun ship of the line launched in 1827
- Russian ship Imperatritsa Maria (1853), an 84-gun ship of the line launched in 1853
- Russian battleship Imperatritsa Mariya, a dreadnought battleship launched in 1913
