= Cape Anguille =

Westernmost point of Newfoundland, Canada

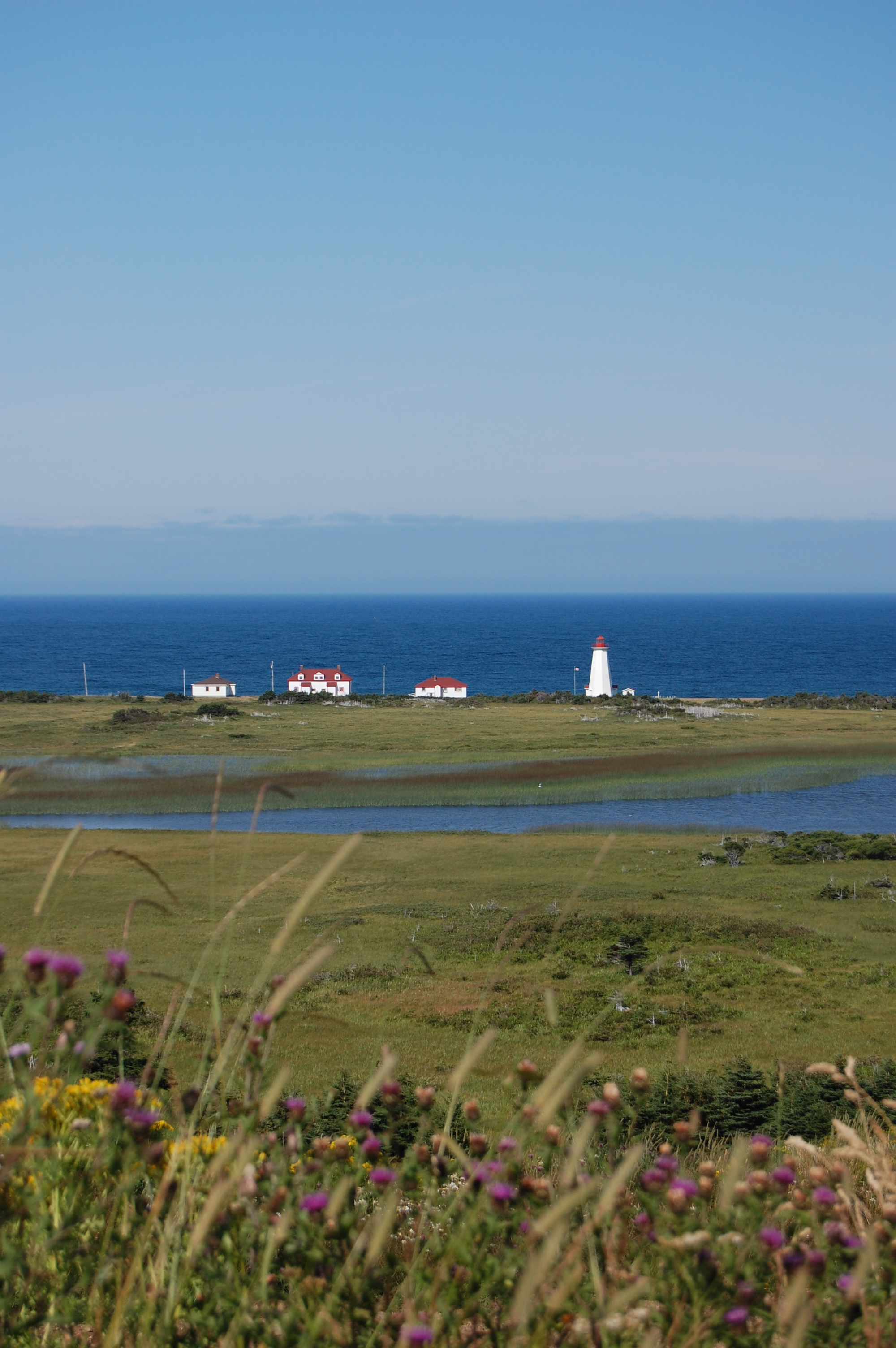
- Location: Newfoundland and Labrador, Canada
- Coordinates: 47°53′52″N 59°24′46″W
- Constructed: 1908
- 1960 light
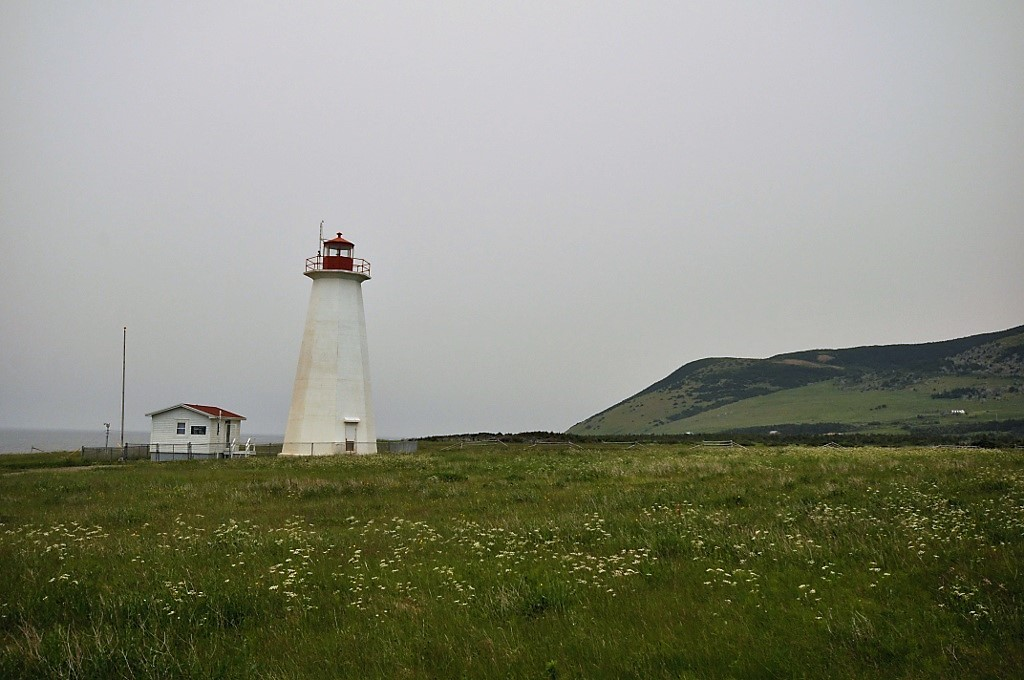
- Constructed: 1960
- Construction: concrete (tower), aluminium (lantern)
- Height: 17.8 m (58 ft)
- Shape: frustum
- Markings: White, red (lantern)
- Operator: Southwest Coast Development Association
- Heritage: recognized federal heritage building of Canada, heritage lighthouse
- Fog signal: blast every 30s.
- Focal height: 24.7 m (81 ft)
- Lens: third order Fresnel lens
- Range: 15 nmi (28 km; 17 mi)
- Characteristic: Fl W 5s
- 1908 light
- Constructed: 1908
- Height: 32 m (105 ft)
- Shape: Octagonal truncated with eight flying buttress tower with balcony and lantern

Cape Anguille (/ænˈɡwɪl/ an-GWIL) is a headland and the westernmost point in Newfoundland, reaching into the Gulf of Saint Lawrence. It is the southern edge of St. George's Bay. Its name is derived from the French word anguille, which means eel. Close to the cape is the community of Cape Anguille.

The new lighthouse was established in Cape Anguille in 1960, replacing a predecessor from 1908. The new lighthouse is octagonal pyramidal in shape, 17.7 metres (58 feet) tall, and made of concrete. The light is emitted at a focal plane of 35 metres (115 ft) above sea level, showing a characteristic of one white flash every five seconds.

== Lighthouse keepers ==
- Alfred Patry 1908–1943
- J. Laurier Patry 1943–1983
- Henry Reid 1984–1991
- Leonard Patry 1991–present

== See also ==
- List of lighthouses in Newfoundland and Labrador
- List of lighthouses in Canada
- Henri de Miffonis
