= Belfast Steamship Company =

- House flag
- Industry: Shipping
- Founded: 1852
- Defunct: 1975
- Successor: Coast Lines
- Headquarters: Belfast, Ireland/Northern Ireland
- Area served: Belfast, Liverpool (England)

The Belfast Steamship Company provided shipping services between Belfast in Ireland (later Northern Ireland) and Liverpool in England from 1852 to 1975.

== History ==
The company started life in 1824 as the Liverpool and Belfast Steam Packet Company. operated by Langtry & Herdman. They began a steam ship service from Belfast to Liverpool.

Vessels introduced were as follows:

- PS Chieftain, 1826
- PS Corsair, 1827
- PS Falcon, 1835
- PS Reindeer, 1838
- PS Sea-King, 1845
- PS Blenheim, 1848

About 1830 the Dublin Steam Packet Company began a weekly service in competition. On 31 January 1852 the Liverpool and Belfast Steam Packet Company was registered as The Belfast Steamship Company Ltd. In 1859, it expanded and absorbed the Cork Steamship Company and in 1866 it absorbed the Londonderry Steamboat Company. It was absorbed into Coast Lines in 1919 as a subsidiary company, which was subsequently absorbed into P&O Ferries in 1975.
