= List of ship launches in 1845 =

The list of ship launches in 1845 includes a chronological list of some ships launched in 1845.

Date	Ship	Class	Builder	Location	Country	Notes
1 January	Foigh-a-Ballaugh	Steamship	Messrs. Caird & Company	Greenock	United Kingdom	For private owner.
1 January	Mogul	East Indiaman	Messrs. William Simons & Co.	Greenock	United Kingdom	For private owner.
9 January	Bloodhound	Paddle gunvessel	Robert Napier and Sons	Govan	United Kingdom	For Royal Navy.
9 January	Ondine	Paddle steamer	Messrs. Miller, Ravenhill & Co.	Blackwall	United Kingdom	For private owner.
9 January	St. Andrew	Full-rigged ship	Messrs. William Simons & Co.	Greenock	United Kingdom	For Mr. Pinkerton.
10 January	Sutlej	Accommodation ship		Bombay	India	For British East India Company.
11 January	Iron Prince	Steamship	Messrs. James Hodgson & Co.	Liverpool	United Kingdom	For private owner.
22 January	Rainbow	Clipper	Smith & Dimon	New York	United States	For Howland & Aspinwall.
23 January	Acasta	Barque	A. Hall	Aberdeen	United Kingdom	For B. Moir.
24 January	Britannia	Full-rigged ship	Messrs. Robert Steele & Company	Greenock	United Kingdom	For private owner.
25 January	Beatrice Catherine	Sloop	Ellis	Garth	United Kingdom	For private owner.
25 January	Sea King	Steamship	Messrs. Tod & McGregor	Glasgow	United Kingdom	For private owner.
31 January	Chase	Fishing vessel	Messrs. Reedman & Dickie	Arbroath	United Kingdom	For private owner.
January	Dorothy Ann	Brigantine	J. Barkes	Sunderland	United Kingdom	For W. Spencer.
January	Hero	Barque	H. & W. Carr	Sunderland	United Kingdom	For Blair & Co.
January	Hero	Barque	Messrs. A. Duthie & Co	Aberdeen	United Kingdom	For William Duthie.
5 February	Gipsy	Schooner	Messrs. William Hood, Rowan & Co.	Kelvinhaugh	United Kingdom	For Glasgow & Liverpool Shipping Co.
6 February	Terrible	Paddle frigate	Oliver Lang	Woolwich Dockyard	United Kingdom	For Royal Navy.
8 February	Harriet Humble	Merchantman	Messrs. Humble, Milcrest & Co.	Liverpool	United Kingdom	For Michael Humble.
11 February	Albion	full-rigged ship	Messrs. Robert Steele & Company	Greenock	United Kingdom	For private owner.
11 February	Erromanga	Barque	John Scott & Sons	Greenock	United Kingdom	For James Kelso.
18 February	Louisa	Schooner	Westacott	Barnstaple	United Kingdom	For private owner.
22 February	Seine	Fluyt		Rochefort	France	For French Navy.
25 February	Torch	Paddle steamer	Ditchburn & Mare	Leamouth	United Kingdom	For Royal Navy.
February	Rein Deer	Merchantman	Messrs. Tindall & Co.	Scarborough	United Kingdom	For Alex Tindall & Others.
February	Templar	Barque	William R. Abbay	Sunderland	United Kingdom	For William R. Abbay.
4 March	Atuaria	Snow	Lister & Bartram	Sunderland	United Kingdom	For Lister & Co.
8 March	Bellairs	East Indiaman	Messrs. Clarke & Sons	Liverpool	United Kingdom	For Mr. Webb & others.
8 March	British Tar	Barque	John Gales	Hylton	United Kingdom	For John Gales.
8 March	Lahore	East Indiaman	Peter Cato	Liverpool	United Kingdom	For Cato & Burt.
8 March	Polka	Schooner	Ralph Hutchinson	Sunderland	United Kingdom	For Ogle & Douglas.
10 March	Caractacus	Barque	Peter Austin	Sunderland	United Kingdom	For Pow & Co.
10 March	Clarissa	Snow	William Potts	Sunderland	United Kingdom	For William Potts.
10 March	Lord Nelson	Brig	Tiffin	Sunderland	United Kingdom	For Donkin & Co.
11 March	Fairy Queen	Barque	John Watson	Sunderland	United Kingdom	For private owner.
11 March	William & Ann	Merchantman	W. Naisby	Hylton	United Kingdom	For Mr. Walker.
22 March	Sea Nymph	Paddle steamer	Caird & Company	Greenock	United Kingdom	For North West of Ireland Union Steam Company.
24 March	Repeal	Sloop		Castleford	United Kingdom	For Aire and Calder Bottle Company.
26 March	Hannah Salkield	East Indiaman	Messrs. Steele & Son	Liverpool	United Kingdom	For private owner.
26 March	Rambler	Steamship	Robert Napier and Sons	Govan	United Kingdom	For Glasgow and Londonderry Steam Packet Company.
26 March	Spitfire	Spitfire-class gunvessel	Oliver Lang Jr.	Chatham Dockyard	United Kingdom	For Royal Navy.
27 March	Britannia	Steamship	Messrs. Smith & Rodger	Glasgow	United Kingdom	For private owner.
27 March	Faugh-a-Ballaugh	Schooner	Messrs. Charles Connell & Sons	Belfast	United Kingdom	For Mr. Cuddy.
March	Fairy Queen	Schooner	W. & J. Pile	Sunderland	United Kingdom	For W. Walker & Co.
March	Marchioness of Lorne	Steamship	Robert Napier and Sons	Govan	United Kingdom	For private owner.
8 April	Alfred	East Indiaman	Messrs. Green	Blackwall	United Kingdom	For private owner.
8 April	Favourite	Barge	Messrs. P. Chaloner & Sons	Liverpool	United Kingdom	For Messrs. P. Chaloner & Sons.
8 April	Kingfisher	Brig		Pembroke Dockyard	United Kingdom	For Royal Navy.
9 April	The Breeze	Schooner	James North	Hull	United Kingdom	For Messrs Sawyer & Graburn.
16 April	Santa Claus	Paddle steamer	W. & T. Collyer	New York	United States	For E. Fitch & Co.
22 April	Alarm	Spartan-class corvette		Sheerness Dockyard	United Kingdom	For Royal Navy.
22 April	Fire Fly	Paddle steamer	Messrs. Tod & McGregor	Glasgow	United Kingdom	For private owner.
23 April	Clio	Barque	Austin & Mills	Sunderland	United Kingdom	For Colling & Co.
23 April	Lady Petre	East Indiaman	Curling & Young	Limehouse	United Kingdom	For Joseph Somes.
23 April	Preussischer Adler	Steamship	Messrs Thomas Vernon & Co.	Liverpool	United Kingdom	For Prussian Government.
23 April	William Watson	Full-rigged ship	Messrs. A. McMillan & Sons	Dumbarton	United Kingdom	For private owner.
23 April	Wladimir	Steamship	Messrs. Thomas Vernon & Co.	Liverpool	United Kingdom	For Imperial Russian Government.
23 April	Wyvern	Yacht		Tenby	United Kingdom	For Trevor Roper.
24 April	Lima	Merchantman	Roydon	Liverpool	United Kingdom	For Job Bros.
24 April	Torrington	Schooner	Messrs. Hall's	Aberdeen	United Kingdom	For Old Leith and London Shipping Co.
26 April	Mehemet Ali	Barque	John Alcock	Sunderland	United Kingdom	For H. Alcock.
26 April	The Consort	Schooner	Messrs. Walter Hood & Co	Aberdeen	United Kingdom	For George Leslie.
April	Anaconda	Yacht	Joseph White	Cowes	United Kingdom	For Charles Ibbotson.
April	Boadicea	Barque	Austin & Mills	Sunderland	United Kingdom	For Parker & Co.
April	Cleopatra	Merchantman			United Kingdom	For private owner.
April	William Ponton	Brig	Messrs. Hall & Sons	Aberdeen	United Kingdom	For private owner.
3 May	Ben-my-Chree	Paddle steamer	Robert Napier and Sons	Govan	United Kingdom	For Isle of Man Steam Packet Company.
6 May	Triton	Steamship	Messrs. Ditchburn & Mare	Leamouth	United Kingdom	For General Steam Navigation Company.
8 May	Calypso	Daphne-class ship-sloop		Chatham Dockyard	United Kingdom	For Royal Navy.
8 May	Raleigh	Raleigh-class frigate		Chatham Dockyard	United Kingdom	For Royal Navy.
9 May	Prince of Wales	Schooner	Messrs. William Simpson & Co.	Aberdeen	United Kingdom	For Old Leith and London Shipping Co.
10 May	Sovereign	Steamboat	Messrs. Tod & McGregor	Glasgow	United Kingdom	For Messrs. Henderson & McKellar.
14 May	Loch Lomond	Steamship	William Denny and Brothers	Dumbarton	United Kingdom	For private owner.
22 May	Inflexible	Bulldog-class sloop		Pembroke Dockyard	United Kingdom	For Royal Navy.
23 May	Gauntlet	Cutter yacht	Messrs. Austin & Son	Portsmouth	United Kingdom	For Andrew Fountayne.
23 May	Trafalgar	Barque	Messrs. William H. Rowan & Co.	Kelvinhaugh	United Kingdom	For private owners.
24 May	Avenger	Cutter yacht	G. Hansen	Cowes	United Kingdom	For James Saunders.
24 May	Prince Ernest	Steamship	John Laird	North Birkenhead	United Kingdom	For South Eastern Railway.
29 May	Bangor	Steamship	Betts, Harlan, and Hollingsworth	Wilmington, Delaware	United States	For Bangor Steam Navigation Co.
May	Belinda	Full-rigged ship			United Kingdom	For private owner.
May	Free Briton	Merchantman	W. Spowers & Co.	Sunderland	United Kingdom	For J. W. Roxby.
2 June	Superior	Brig	Charles Alcock	Sunderland	United Kingdom	For private owner.
5 June	Queen of the French	Steamship	Ditchburn & Mare	Leamouth	United Kingdom	For South Eastern Railway.
7 June	Opal	Schooner	Messrs. John Scott & Sons	Greenock	United Kingdom	For private owner.
7 June	The Lady of the Lake	Steamboat		Newby Bridge	United Kingdom	For private owner.
10 June	Vandal	Cutter yacht	Michael Ratsey	Cowes	United Kingdom	For R. W. Cooper.
11 June	Fidelia	Packet ship			United States	For Old Black Ball Line.
13 June	Caledonia	Merchantman	John Duncan	Kingston-port	United Kingdom	For Mr. Carney and others.
June	Caprice	Cutter yacht	Michael Ratsey	Cowes	United Kingdom	For private owner.
June	Heather Bell	Barque		Pictou	(United Kingdom of Great Britain and Ireland) Colony of Nova Scotia	For private owner.
June	Hirundo	Barque	Rodham & Todd	Sunderland	United Kingdom	For Mr. Rodham.
June	Marcia	Snow	Austin & Mills	Sunderland	United Kingdom	For Wake & Co.
June	Unnamed (Note: Subsequently named Blenheim.)	Full-rigged ship	Middle Dock Company	South Shields	United Kingdom	For private owner. Collided with the paddle steamer Velocity on being launched.
1 July	Rob Roy	Steamship	Messrs. Denny's	Dumbarton	United Kingdom	For Lochlomond Company.
5 July	Gipsy	Steamship		Northam	United Kingdom	For private owner.
5 July	Nautilus	Barque	Messrs. T. Young & Son	South Shields	United Kingdom	For private owner.
17 July	Dragon	Centaur-class frigate		Pembroke Dockyard	United Kingdom	For Royal Navy.
19 July	Active	Pique-class frigate		Chatham Dockyard	United Kingdom	For Royal Navy.
July	Advena	Snow	William Potts	Sunderland	United Kingdom	For William Potts.
July	Hynford	Barque		New Glasgow	(United Kingdom of Great Britain and Ireland) Colony of Nova Scotia	For private owner.
July	Madrid	Steamship	Messrs. Miller, Ravenhill & Co.	Blackwall	United Kingdom	For Peninsular and Oriental Steam Navigation Company.
July	Massachusetts	Steamship		New York	United States	For Ocean Line.
2 August	Heroine	Yacht			United Kingdom	For Mr. Wanhill.
2 August	Secret	Yacht			United Kingdom	For private owner.
4 August	John Dalton	Full-rigged ship	builder	Chepstow	United Kingdom	For Bradford, Chapman and two others.
5 August	Avenger	Paddle frigate	William Edye	Devonport Dockyard	United Kingdom	For Royal Navy.
19 August	Clorinde	Frigate		Cherbourg	France	For French Navy.
19 August	Favourite	Brig	Messrs. Simmons and Bevan	Wapping	United Kingdom	For private owner.
19 August	Glenorchy	Full-rigged ship		Greenock	United Kingdom	For private owner.
23 August	Tintern	Steamship	Great Western Steam-ship Company	Bristol	United Kingdom	For Messrs. Darby & Sim.
August	Barkhill	Barque	T. Royden	Liverpool	United Kingdom	For Messrs. Job Bros.
August	James	Barque		Saint John	(United Kingdom of Great Britain and Ireland) Colony of New Brunswick	For private owner.
August	Mary & Sarah	Snow	W. Wilkinson	Sunderland	United Kingdom	For Thomas B. Wilkinson.
August	Syren	Brig		Bay of Fundy	(United Kingdom of Great Britain and Ireland) Unknown	For private owner.
17 September	Christabel	Snow	James Alexander	Workington	United Kingdom	For George Holt Sr. & George Holt Jr.
18 September	Lady Louisa Kerr	Schooner	G. S. Halloran	Glenarm	United Kingdom	For private owner.
18 September	Ondine	Schooner yacht	Michael Ratsey	Cowes	United Kingdom	For W. B. Ponsonby.
20 September	Gipsy King	Schooner	Messrs. William H. Rowan & Co.	Kelvinhaugh	United Kingdom	For Glasgow and Liverpool Shipping Co.
21 September	Kovanna	Frigate		Sevastopol	Russia	For Imperial Russian Navy.
21 September	Orpheus	Brig		Sevastopol	Russia	For Imperial Russian Navy.
September	Allport	Snow	Sykes & Co	Sunderland	United Kingdom	For Smith & Co.
September	Growler	Brig		Tatamagouche	(United Kingdom of Great Britain and Ireland) Colony of Nova Scotia	For private owner.
1 October	Creole	Spartan-class corvette		Devonport Dockyard	United Kingdom	For Royal Navy.
2 October	Bulldog	Bulldog-class sloop		Chatham Dockyard	United Kingdom	For Royal Navy.
2 October	Equator	Schooner	Messrs. W. & A. Adamson	Woodside	United Kingdom	For private owner.
6 October	Centaur	Centaur-class frigate		Portsmouth Dockyard	United Kingdom	For Royal Navy.
3 October	Beas	Accommodation ship		Bombay	India	For British East India Company.
15 October	Ostrich	Barque	Messrs. T. & W. Smith	North Shields	United Kingdom	For private owner.
18 October	Gardyne	Barque	Messrs. Edward Gibson & Son	Hull	United Kingdom	For Messrs. McTear & Hadfield.
31 October	Alliance	Schooner	W. & J. Pile	Sunderland	United Kingdom	For private owner.
31 October	Ecuador	Steamship	Messrs. Tod & McGregor	Glasgow	United Kingdom	For private owner.
31 October	Ravee	Accommodation ship		Bombay	India	For British East India Company.
October	Admiral Nelson	Merchantman	J. S. Coutts	Low Walker	United Kingdom	For private owner.
October	Ann	Merchantman	Benjamin Hodgson	Sunderland	United Kingdom	For Ogle & C0.
October	Hydrus	Schooner			(United Kingdom of Great Britain and Ireland) Colony of Prince Edward Island	For private owner.
October	Lyra	Snow	J. Stobart or Stobart & Soppit	Sunderland	United Kingdom	For Reed & Co.
7 November	Sviatoslav	Sultan Makhmud-class ship of the line	I. S. Dimitriev	Nicholaieff	Russia	For Imperial Russian Navy.
13 November	Alexander	Brig	Armstrong	Newcastle upon Tyne	United Kingdom	For private owner.
13 November	Rosina	Brig	Lambert	Newcastle upon Tyne	United Kingdom	For private owner.
14 November	Grapler	Buoy tender		Bombay	India	For British East India Company.
14 November	Larch	Barque		Saint John	(United Kingdom of Great Britain and Ireland) Colony of New Brunswick	For private owner.
15 November	Roscommon	Steamship	Peter Cato	Liverpool	United Kingdom	For City of Dublin Steam Navigation Company.
November	Amity	Merchantman	W. Spowers	Sunderland	United Kingdom	For Mr. Gourley.
November	Anna	Merchantman	Sykes & Co.	Sunderland	United Kingdom	For Tanner & Co.
November	Defiance	Barque	Messrs. Wilmett & Hall	Newport	United Kingdom	For private owner.
2 December	William Wells	Schooner	Messrs. Humphrey & Co.	Hull	United Kingdom	For Messrs. Wells, Rocket & Co.
2 December	Margaret	Sloop	Ward	Kilplapyke	United Kingdom	For private owner.
3 December	Brian Boiroihme	Steamship	Robert Napier and Sons	Govan	United Kingdom	For Drogheda New Steam Packet Company.
4 December	Jane Hughes	Schooner	Messrs. Thompson & Kirwan	Belfast	United Kingdom	For B. Hughes.
10 December	Hero	Schooner	James Lunan	Peterhead	United Kingdom	For Peterhead and Leith Shipping Co.
16 December	Trident	Paddle sloop	Ditchburn & Mare	Leamouth	United Kingdom	For Royal Navy.
30 December	Ariel	Clipper	Messrs. Menzies & Sons	Leith	United Kingdom	For Hull and Leith Shipping Company.
30 December	Birkenhead	Paddle frigate	John Laird	Birkenhead	United Kingdom	For Royal Navy.
31 December	Fury	Bulldog-class sloop		Sheerness Dockyard	United Kingdom	For Royal Navy.
31 December	Granite	Brig	Messrs. Walter Hood & Co.	Aberdeen	United Kingdom	For Aberdeen Commercial Company.
31 December	Sarah	Schooner	Messrs. Brandritt & Whiteway	Runcorn	United Kingdom	For private owner.
December	Henrietta	Barque		Annapolis, Maryland	United States	For private owner.
Unknown date	Adder	Full-rigged ship		Vlissingen	Netherlands	For Royal Netherlands Navy.
Unknown date	Adele	Merchantman	John Candlish	Southwick	United Kingdom	For Mr. Mesnard.
Unknown date	Alexander Campbell	Snow	Benjamin Hodgson & Co	Sunderland	United Kingdom	For Winship & Co.
Unknown date	Alicia	Barque	William Wilkinson	Sunderland	United Kingdom	For Jenkings & Co.
Unknown date	Ann	Merchantman	J. Crown	Sunderland	United Kingdom	For C. Humble.
Unknown date	Aruba	Full-rigged ship		Curaçao	(Netherlands) Curaçao and Dependencies	For Royal Netherlands Navy.
Unknown date	Athole	Barque	Richard Wilkinson	Sunderland	United Kingdom	For Mr. Barbour.
Unknown date	Aurora	Schooner		Sunderland	United Kingdom	For A. Simpson.
Unknown date	Bannockburn	Barque	James Laing	Sunderland	United Kingdom	For Duncan Dunbar.
Unknown date	Baracoa	Merchantman	A. McLaine	Belfast	United Kingdom	For private owner.
Unknown date	Bibb	Steamship		Pittsburgh, Pennsylvania	United States	For United States Revenue Marine.
Unknown date	Borderer	Barque	William Byers	Sunderland	United Kingdom	For John Willis.
Unknown date	Brenda	Snow		Sunderland	United Kingdom	For Mr. Thompson.
Unknown date	Catherine Jenkins	Barque		Sunderland	United Kingdom	For Jenkins & Co.
Unknown date	Chance	Snow	J. & J. Robinson	Sunderland	United Kingdom	For Mr. Thompson.
Unknown date	Charles Richard	Merchantman		Sunderland	United Kingdom	For Mr. Fenwick.
Unknown date	Chaseley	Barque		Sunderland	United Kingdom	For Brice & Co.
Unknown date	Choice	Barque		Sunderland	United Kingdom	For Hick & Co.
Unknown date	Courier	Brig	T. & J. Brocklebank	Whitehaven	United Kingdom	For Thomas & John Brocklebank.
Unknown date	Coverdale	Merchantman	J. Rogerson	Sunderland	United Kingdom	For Mr. Thompson.
Unknown date	Die Schone Mainzem	Paddle steamer	Bridge Foundry Company	Warrington	United Kingdom	For private owner.
Unknown date	Dolphin	Snow	William Doxford & W. Crown	Sunderland	United Kingdom	For J. Culliford & Co.
Unknown date	Dunbrody	Barque	Thomas Hamilton Oliver	Quebec	(United Kingdom of Great Britain and Ireland) Province of Canada	For Mr. Graves.
Unknown date	Ebenezer	Mersey flat	John Thompson	Northwich	United Kingdom	For private owner.
Unknown date	Echo	Merchantman		Baltimore, Maryland	United States	For private owner.
Unknown date	Edmundsbury	Barque	Peter Austin	Sunderland	United Kingdom	For J. Allan.
Unknown date	Elizabeth	Schooner	M. Storey	Sunderland	United Kingdom	For private owner.
Unknown date	Eliza Stewart	Full-rigged ship			United Kingdom	For Stewart & Co.
Unknown date	Ellen	Schooner	Thomas Barber	Wells-next-the-Sea	United Kingdom	For Joseph Southgate.
Unknown date	Emma	Barque		Sunderland	United Kingdom	For Holt & Co.
Unknown date	European	Merchantman	L. T. Wang	Sunderland	United Kingdom	For J. Denton.
Unknown date	Fairy	Royal yacht	Ditchburn & Mare	Leamouth	United Kingdom	For Queen Victoria.
Unknown date	Fairy	Barque	W. Thompson	Sunderland	United Kingdom	For S. Allcock.
Unknown date	Florinda	Schooner		New Orleans, Louisiana	United States	For Frederick Arnet.
Unknown date	Frances	Merchantman	James Laing	Sunderland	United Kingdom	For G. Milne.
Unknown date	Fredonia	Barque		Newbury, Massachusetts	United States	For Micajah Lunt & John Currier.
Unknown date	George Smith	Snow		Sunderland	United Kingdom	For Smith & Co.
Unknown date	Glenlyon	Barque	Buchanan & Gibson	Sunderland	United Kingdom	For Mr. Cropton.
Unknown date	Grange	Snow	Austin & Mills	Sunderland	United Kingdom	For G. Hudson.
Unknown date	Hawthorn	Merchantman	William Doxford & W. Crown	Sunderland	United Kingdom	For Mr. Doxford.
Unknown date	Henry Clay	Packet ship		New York	United States	For private owner.
Unknown date	Isabella	Merchantman		Sunderland	United Kingdom	For Ayre & Co.
Unknown date	Jabez	Snow		Sunderland	United Kingdom	For S. Evans.
Unknown date	James Clark	Brigantine		Hillsborough	(United Kingdom of Great Britain and Ireland) Colony of New Brunswick	For private owner.
Unknown date	Jane Hughes	Merchantman	Thompsons & Kirwan	Belfast	United Kingdom	For private owner.
Unknown date	Jane Innes	Schooner			United Kingdom	For private owner.
Unknown date	Jefferson	Survey ship	Freeman, Knapp & Totten	Fort Pitt, Pennsylvania	United States	For United States Revenue Cutter Service.
Unknown date	Jessie	Merchantman	J. Barkes	Sunderland	United Kingdom	For Woods & Co.
Unknown date	John Elliotson	Merchantman	William Doxford & W. Crown	Sunderland	United Kingdom	For T. Brown.
Unknown date	John Hutchinson	Barque	R. Hutchinson	Sunderland	United Kingdom	For R. Hutchinson & family.
Unknown date	Lady of the Lake	Paddle steamer	R. Ashburner	Newby Bridge	United Kingdom	For Windermere Steam Yacht Co. Ltd.
Unknown date	Lancaster Lass	Sloop		Sunderland	United Kingdom	For private owner.
Unknown date	Light and Sign	Merchantman	John Barkes	Sunderland	United Kingdom	For Messrs. Light and Sign.
Unknown date	Looshtauk	Merchantman	Lovett and Parker	Tynemouth Creek	(United Kingdom of Great Britain and Ireland) Colony of New Brunswick	For private owner.
Unknown date	Mary	Merchantman	J. Hutchinson	Sunderland	United Kingdom	For Mr Davison.
Unknown date	Mary	Snow	Bowman and Drummond	Blyth	United Kingdom	For E. Coles.
Unknown date	Mary Ann	brig	J. Rodgerson	Hylton	United Kingdom	For Mr. Hutchinson.
Unknown date	Mary Clarke	Schooner	L. T. Wang	Sunderland	United Kingdom	For T. Clarke.
Unknown date	Mary Lawson	Merchantman	T. Lawson	Sunderland	United Kingdom	For Mr. Lawson.
Unknown date	Massachusetts	Gunvessel	Samuel Hall	Boston, Massachusetts	United States	For United States Navy.
Unknown date	Mayda	Barque		Sunderland	United Kingdom	For G. Lyall Jr.
Unknown date	McLane	Legere-class paddle steamer	Cyrus Alger	Boston, Massachusetts	United States	For United States Revenue Cutter Service.
Unknown date	Medora	Snow	J. Crown	Sunderland	United Kingdom	For J. Hay & Co.
Unknown date	Medusa	Merchantman	Tiffin	Sunderland	United Kingdom	For G. Spark.
Unknown date	Medway	Barque	Messrs. Tindall	Scarborough	United Kingdom	For private owner.
Unknown date	Mistley Park	Brig	Hodgson	Hylton	United Kingdom	For T. Greene.
Unknown date	Moult	Sloop	William Bonker	Salcombe	United Kingdom	For Richard H. Staden and others.
Unknown date	Niagara	Palace steamer	Bidwell & Banta	Buffalo, New York	United States	For Collingwood Line.
Unknown date	Niagara	Barque		Sunderland	United Kingdom	For Mr. Temperley.
Unknown date	Nordenskjöld	Brig			Sweden	For Royal Swedish Navy.
Unknown date	Ocean	Merchantman	J. Barkes	Sunderland	United Kingdom	For J. Barry.
Unknown date	Ophelia	Merchantman	J. & J. Robinson	Sunderland	United Kingdom	For A. White.
Unknown date	Oregon	Paddle steamer			United States	For George Law.
Unknown date	Pallas	Sixth rate		Rotterdam	Netherlands	For Royal Netherlands Navy.
Unknown date	Phoenix	Steamship	Pease & Allen	Cleveland, Ohio	United States	For private owner.
Unknown date	Polynesia	Merchantman		Sunderland	United Kingdom	For Mr. Hansell.
Unknown date	Powhatan	Paddle steamer	John A. Robb & E. T. Robb	Baltimore, Maryland	United States	For private owner.
Unknown date	Primula	Barque	J. & J. Rodham	Sunderland	United Kingdom	For J. & J. Rodham.
Unknown date	Promise	Merchantman		Sunderland	United Kingdom	For Brown & Co.
Unknown date	Propeller	Paddle steamer			United Kingdom	For private owner. Propelled by "dash boards".
Unknown date	Queen	Schooner		Sunderland	United Kingdom	For private owner.
Unknown date	Queen	Paddle steamer	Mr. Brooming	Calstock	United Kingdom	For G. Harvey.
Unknown date	Rainbow	Clipper	Smith & Dimon	New York	United States	For Howland & Aspinwall.
Unknown date	Ramillies	Merchantman		Sunderland	United Kingdom	For Duncan Dunbar.
Unknown date	Ribicon	Merchantman	Benjamin Hodgson & Co.	Sunderland	United Kingdom	For private owner.
Unknown date	Richard Cobden	Barque	Alexander Stepher & Sons	Dundee	United Kingdom	For William Small.
Unknown date	Roger Williams	Paddle steamer	Burtis		United States	For private owner.
Unknown date	Rokeby	Merchantman	William R. Abbay	Sunderland	United Kingdom	For Mr. Hodgson.
Unknown date	Rover's Bride	Snow		Sunderland	United Kingdom	For Mr. Fenwick.
Unknown date	Sandford	Full-rigged ship		Sunderland	United Kingdom	For Robinson & Co.
Unknown date	Sea Lark	Schooner	John Norris Russell	Limerick	United Kingdom	For Messrs. John Norris Russell & Sons.
Unknown date	Sea Queen	Steamship			United Kingdom	For private owner.
Unknown date	Sibella	Barque	James Leithead	Sunderland	United Kingdom	For Mr. Luscomb.
Unknown date	Sir Henry Webb	Snow	Todd & Brown	Sunderland	United Kingdom	For T. Browne.
Unknown date	Sir John Rennie	Snow	E. Brown	Sunderland	United Kingdom	For Brown & Co.
Unknown date	Sisters	Merchantman	T. Ogden	Sunderland	United Kingdom	For Mr. Nicholson.
Unknown date	Sperwer	Full-rigged ship		Vlissingen	Netherlands	For Royal Netherlands Navy.
Unknown date	Stagshaw	Snow	T. Alcock	Sunderland	United Kingdom	For T. Alcock.
Unknown date	Templar	Barque	James Leithead	Sunderland	United Kingdom	For Duncan Dunbar.
Unknown date	Tonquin	Merchantman	Waterman & Ewell	Medford, Massachusetts	United States	For George R. Minot and Nathaniel Hooper.
Unknown date	Saint Mary	Steamship		Williamsburg, New York	United States	For private owner.
Unknown date	Svalen	Man of war			Sweden	For Royal Swedish Navy.
Unknown date	Virginia	Steamship			United States	For private owner.
Unknown date	Washington	Pilot boat	C. & R. Poillon	Brooklyn, New York	United States	For New York Pilots.
Unknown date	Water Witch	Steamship		Washington Navy Yard	United States	For United States Navy.
Unknown date	William	Merchantman		Sunderland	United Kingdom	For Riley & Co.
Unknown date	Name unknown	Paddle tug		Cincinnati, Ohio	United States	For private owner.

== Notes and references ==
Notes

Sources

- Mitchell, WH; Sawyer, LA (1990). The Empire Ships (Second ed.). London, New York, Hamburg, Hong Kong: Lloyd's of London Press Ltd. ISBN 1-85044-275-4.
