= List of shipwrecks in October 1850 =

The list of shipwrecks in October 1850 includes ships sunk, foundered, wrecked, grounded, or otherwise lost during October 1850.

== 1 October ==
List of shipwrecks: 1 October 1850
Ship	State	Description
Fenna Jeorina	Kingdom of Hanover	The ship departed from Emden for London, United Kingdom. No further trace, presumed foundered with the loss of all hands.
Intellect	United Kingdom	The ship ran aground off Skagen, Denmark. She was on a voyage from Liverpool, Lancashire to Riga, Russia. She was refloated and taken in to Frederikshavn, Denmark.
Jenny	Sweden	The ship was driven ashore whilst on a voyage from Stockholm to Nantes, Loire-Inférieure, France. She was refloated and put in to Boulogne, Pas-de-Calais, France.
Lord Keane	United Kingdom	The ship foundered off the Isles of Scilly. Her crew were rescued. She was on a voyage from Cork to Truro, Cornwall.
Tino	United Kingdom	The schooner ran aground on the Cork Sand, in the North Sea off the coast of Suffolk. She was refloated with the assistance of four smacks.
Turk	Ottoman Empire	The ship ran aground off Skagen. She was on a voyage from Málaga, Spain to Saint Petersburg, Russia. She was refloated and taken in to Frederikshavn.
Vrouw Lydia	Flag unknown	The koff sank at Helsingør, Denmark. She was on a voyage from Saint Petersburg, Russia to Honfleur, Calvados. She was refloated on 11 October and taken in to Helsingør.

== 2 October ==
List of shipwrecks: 2 October 1850
Ship	State	Description
Felicidade	Brazil	African slave trade: The brig was captured off the coast of Brazil by HMS Sharpshooter (Royal Navy). Her crew were taken off and she was sunk for target practice.
Fortuna	Sweden	The ship sprang a leak and was beached on Skagen, Denmark. Her crew were rescued. She was on a voyage from Gothenburg to Kingston upon Hull, Yorkshire, United Kingdom.
Isaac Mead	United States	The barque was run down and sunk in the Atlantic Ocean by the steamship Southerner (United States) with the loss of 24 of the 49 people on board. She was on a voyage from Savannah, Georgia to New York.
St. Antoine	France	The ship was wrecked on the coast of Corsica. she was on a voyage from Marseille, Bouches-du-Rhône to Ajaccio, Corsia.

== 3 October ==
List of shipwrecks: 3 October 1850
Ship	State	Description
Astrea	Stettin	The ship was wrecked near Tahkuranna, Russia. Her crew were rescued. She was on a voyage from Stettin to Pärnu, Russia.
George W. Snow	United States	The ship was discovered in distress in the Atlantic Ocean 60 nautical miles (110 km) off Charleston, South Carolina by Catherine (United Kingdom), which took off three of her five crew. The remainder refused to leave. There was no sign of the vessel the next day, presumed foundered.
Lightfoot	United Kingdom	The ship was driven ashore and wrecked in the Saint Lawrence River upstream of Griffin's Cove. Her crew were rescued.
Nancy	United Kingdom	The brig struck the Ballyghenny Pladdy Rock and was damaged. She was on a voyage from Ardrossan, Ayrshire to Dublin. She consequently put in to Strangford, County Down in a waterlogged condition.
Preciosa Victoria	Spain	The ship was abandoned in the Atlantic Ocean. Her crew were rescued by Charles Edward (United States). Preciosa Victoria was on a voyage from St. Jago de Cuba, Cuba to Cádiz.

== 4 October ==
List of shipwrecks: 4 October 1850
Ship	State	Description
Amelia	United Kingdom	The ship ran aground on the Holm Sand, in the North Sea off the coast of Suffolk. She was refloated the next day and resumed her voyage.
Jane	United Kingdom	The sloop was driven ashore and wrecked at Tynemouth, Northumberland. Her crew were rescued. She was on a voyage from Perth to London.
Mary	United Kingdom	The ship sprang a leak and sank between Ailsa Craig and Sanda Island. Her crew survived. She was on a voyage from Troon, Ayrshire to Málaga, Spain.
Vrouw Lydia	Netherlands	The brig was run down and sunk off Helsingør, Denmark by Northumbria (United Kingdom) with the loss of twelve of her 23 crew.

== 5 October ==
List of shipwrecks: 5 October 1850
Ship	State	Description
Anna Thomas	United Kingdom	The schooner was wrecked near Jonesport, Maine, United States. She was on a voyage from Saint John, New Brunswick, British North America to Provindence, Rhode Island, United States.
Bonne Mère	France	The ship was destroyed by fire at Toulon, Var.
Duchess of Lancaster	United Kingdom	The steamship was in collision with the galiot Loochristie (Netherlands) in the River Mersey and was beached at New Brighton, Cheshire. She was on a voyage from Lancaster to Liverpool, Lancashire. She was refloated the next day and taken in to Liverpool.
Eliza	United Kingdom	The ship struck a rock off Baggy Point, Devon. She capsized and came ashore at Morte Point. Her crew were rescued. She was on a voyage from Bideford, Devon to a Welsh port.
Josephine	United Kingdom	The brig was driven ashore at the mouth of the Mississippi River. She was on a voyage from Havana, Cuba to New Orleans, Louisiana, United States.
St. Jean	France	The ship collided with another vessel and capsized in the Gironde.
Thomas and Joseph Crisp	(United Kingdom of Great Britain and Ireland) South Australia	The ship was driven ashore at Whirlpool Beach, Van Diemen's Land. She was refloated.

== 6 October ==
List of shipwrecks: 6 October 1850
Ship	State	Description
Arkhimed (Архимед, 'Archimedes')	Imperial Russian Navy	The steam frigate ran aground and was wrecked on a reef 2.5 nautical miles (4.6 km) north of Rønne, Bornholm, in the Baltic Sea, with the loss of six or eight of her crew and three rescuers. She was on a voyage from the Great Belt to Russia. Her engine was subsequently salvaged.
Avenger	United Kingdom	The brigantine was in collision with Free Trader (United Kingdom). She consequently sank on 8 October off the Galloper Sand. One rescuer was killed. Avenger was on a voyage from Glasgow, Renfrewshire to London.
Brisk	United Kingdom	The ship was driven ashore at "Buttermilk Castle", County Waterford. She was on a voyage from Newport, Monmouthshire to Cork. She was refloated but consequently sank.
Dexterous	United Kingdom	The schooner ran aground at South Shields, County Durham. She was on a voyage from South Shields to Messina, Sicily. She was refloated and proceeded on her voyage, but consequently put in to Harwich, Essex in a leaky condition.
Jemima	United Kingdom	The ship departed from Liverpool, Lancashire for Old Calabar, Africa. She subsequently foundered in the Irish Sea; a chronometer and longboat from the ship came ashore on 13 October.
Joseph Howe	United Kingdom	The schooner struck a rock and sank at Lochmaddy, North Uist, Outer Hebrides.
Juffrow Jantje	Netherlands	The galiot was wrecked at Dungeness, Kent, United Kingdom with the loss of all but one of her crew. She was on a voyage from Cardiff, Glamorgan, United Kingdom to Frederiksværk, Denmark.
Montanesa	Spain	The ship was wrecked in the Abaco Islands. Her crew were rescued. She was on a voyage from Havana, Cuba to Cádiz.
Perdix	France	The ship was wrecked at Marseille, Bouches-du-Rhône. She was on a voyage from Marseille to Cette, Hérault.

== 7 October ==
List of shipwrecks: 7 October 1850
Ship	State	Description
Alcibiades	Greece	The brig was abandoned off the Point of Ayre, Isle of Man. She was on a voyage from Constantinople, Ottoman Empire to Dublin, United Kingdom. Alcibiades subsequently floated off and drifted out to sea crewless.
Alice	United Kingdom	The schooner sank in Holyhead Bay. Her crew were rescued by the Holyhead Lifeboat. She was on a voyage from Liverpool, Lancashire to Llanelly, Glamorgan.
Anne	United Kingdom	The ship was driven ashore at Garmoyle, County Antrim. She was on a voyage from Ayr to Liverpool.
Arcturus	United Kingdom	The schooner was wrecked at Crosby Point, Lancashire with the loss of two lives. She was on a voyage from Ibraila, Ottoman Empire to Liverpool.
Arthur	United Kingdom	The ship was wrecked on the Leman Sand, in the North Sea. Her crew were rescued by the schooner Cardiff Packet (United Kingdom).
Atlas	United Kingdom	The ship was driven ashore at Teignmouth, Devon. She was on a voyage from Guernsey, Channel Islands to Teignmouth. She was refloated.
Aurora	United Kingdom	The barque was wrecked at Rhoscolyn, Anglesey. Her crew were rescued. She was on a voyage from Cardiff, Glamorgan to Liverpool.
Bamborough Castle	United Kingdom	The schooner was driven ashore at Aberdeen. Her crew were rescued. She was on a voyage from Thurso, Caithness to Perth. She was refloated on 19 October and taken in to Aberdeen.
Celerity	United Kingdom	The ship was abandoned in the North Sea 40 nautical miles (74 km) off Flamborough Head, Yorkshire. Her crew were rescued by the fishing lugger Zipporah (United Kingdom), which lost two of her crew in attempting the rescue. Celerity was on a voyage from Newcastle upon Tyne, Northumberland to London
Celine Lucille	France	The ship was wrecked on the Coal Rock, off the coast of Anglesey. Her crew were rescued. She was on a voyage from Liverpool to Honfleur, Calvados.
Charles Louis	France	The ship foundered off La Rochelle, Charente-Maritime. She was on a voyage from "Lebaume" to Rouen, Seine-Inférieure.
Charlotte	United Kingdom	The ship was driven ashore at Lytham St. Annes, Lancashire. Her crew were rescued. She was on a voyage from Garlieston, Wigtownshire to Bangor, Caernarfonshire.
Dahlia	United Kingdom	The schooner was wrecked on East Point, Prince Edward Island, British North America. She was on a voyage from Richibucto, New Brunswick, British North America to Kingston upon Hull, Yorkshire.
David	United Kingdom	The schooner was driven ashore 2 nautical miles (3.7 km) north west of Rattray Head, Aberdeenshire. Her crew were rescued. She was on a voyage from Thurso to North Sunderland, County Durham. She was later refloated and taken in to Fraserburg, Aberdeenshire, where she was repaired.
Duchess of Kent	(United Kingdom of Great Britain and Ireland) Isle of Man	The ship was driven ashore and wrecked in Machrihanish Bay. All on board were rescued. She was on a voyage from Douglas to Glasgow, Renfrewshire.
Edith	United Kingdom	The schooner was driven ashore at the mouth of the River North Esk. Her crew survived. She was on a voyage from Saint Petersburgh, Russia to Dundee, Forfarshire.
Holderness	United Kingdom	The ship was driven ashore and wrecked at Speymouth, Moray.
Holyhead Trader	United Kingdom	The schooner ran aground on the North Bank, in Liverpool Bay. She was on a voyage from Pentwean, Cornwall to Liverpool. She was refloated and towed in to Liverpool in a derelict condition.
Hope	(United Kingdom of Great Britain and Ireland) Isle of Man	The smack foundered off Ballantrae, Ayrshire with the loss of all hands.
Industry	United Kingdom	The flat sank in Llandudno Bay. Her crew were rescued. She was on a voyage from Port Dinorwic, Caernarfonshire to Liverpool.
Jane and Ellen	United Kingdom	The smack was driven ashore and wrecked at Port Neigwl, Caernarfonshire. She was on a voyage from Runcorn, Cheshire to Barmouth, Merionethshire.
Jane Pope	United Kingdom	The schooner was wrecked on the Gunfleet Sand, in the North Sea off the coast of Essex. Her crew were rescued.
Jenny Lind	United Kingdom	The ship ran aground on the Corton Sand, in the North Sea off the coast of Suffolk. She was on a voyage from Danzig to Kingston upon Hull, Yorkshire. She was refloated and resumed her voyage.
Louisa	Bremen	The full-rigged ship was driven ashore in the Currituck Inlet. All on board were rescued. She was on a voyage from Bremen to Baltimore, Maryland, United States.
Mary Ann	United Kingdom	The ship was driven ashore and damaged at Deal, Kent. She was on a voyage from London to Ascension Island. She was refloated the next day.
Nazionale	Belgium	The ship was abandoned in the Atlantic Ocean. Her crew were rescued by Indiana (United States).
Oceana	United Kingdom	The ship foundered in the Atlantic Ocean 600 nautical miles (1,100 km) south west of Ireland. Her 26 crew were rescued by Penelope (United Kingdom). Oceana was on a voyage from Callao, Peru to Liverpool.
Primavera	United Kingdom	The ship was driven ashore and severely damaged at Plaister Cove, Nova Scotia, British North America. She was on a voyage from Pugwash, Nova Scotia to Cork. She was consequently condemned.
Prince Albert	United Kingdom	The ship ran aground in the Strait of Magellan and was consequently beached at Punta Delgada, Chile. She was attacked by the local inhabitants with the loss of two of her crew, with two of the survivors taken prisoner. They were later released but Prince Albert was set afire on 25 October and destroyed. She was on a voyage from Newport, Monmouthshire to California, United States.
Princess Mary	United Kingdom	The steamship ran aground on the Foreness Rock, Margate, Kent. She was on a voyage from Boulogne, Pas-de-Calais, France to Folkestone, Kent. She was refloated and resumed her voyage.
Princess Victoria	United Kingdom	The ship was driven ashore at the Greenore Lighthouse, County Louth. She was on a voyage from Portmahomack, Ross-shire to Dublin.
Providence	United Kingdom	The ship was driven onto the Burbo Bank, in Liverpool Bay with the loss of 23 of the 36 people on board. Survivors were rescued by the Magazines Lifeboat. She was on a voyage from Liverpool to Africa.
Robert Burns	United Kingdom	The schooner was driven ashore and wrecked at Groomsport, County Down. Her five crew survived.
Sarah	United Kingdom	The schooner was driven ashore and severely damaged at Blackpool, Lancashire.
Standard	United Kingdom	The brig was wrecked near Varberg, Sweden. Her crew were rescued. She was on a voyage from Dundee, Forfarshire to Riga, Russia.
Thompson	United Kingdom	The ship ran aground on the Newcombe Sand, in the North Sea off the coast of Norfolk. She was on a voyage from Seaham, County Durham to London. She was refloated and beached at Great Yarmouth, Norfolk. She was refloated on 3 November.
Tortoise	United Kingdom	The hoy was driven ashore at Maltraeth, Anglesey. She was on a voyage from Holyhead, Anglesey to Plymouth, Devon.

== 8 October ==
List of shipwrecks: 8 October 1850
Ship	State	Description
Admiral Duncan	United Kingdom	The ship was driven ashore at North Sunderland, County Durham. She was on a voyage from Newcastle upon Tyne to Berwick upon Tweed, Northumberland. She was refloated the next day and taken in to North Sunderland in a leaky condition.
Astrea	United Kingdom	The ship foundered in the North Sea off Flamborough Head, Yorkshire. Her crew were rescued by Maria (United Kingdom). Astrea was on a voyage from Newcastle upon Tyne to Rotterdam, South Holland, Netherlands.
Belize	United Kingdom	The ship ran aground on the Swinebottoms, off the coast of Denmark. She was on a voyage from "Wyburg" to London. She was refloated on 16 October and taken in to Helsingør, Denmark.
Benjamin Franklin	United States	Benjamin Franklin The wooden paddle steamer ran aground in Lake Huron on Thunder Bay Island off the coast of Michigan and sank in 55 feet (17 m) of water at 45.032233°N 83.19215°W.
Commerce	(United Kingdom of Great Britain and Ireland) Jersey	The sloop was driven ashore at Southport, Lancashire.
Freedom	United Kingdom	The sloop was driven ashore at Southport.
Gem	United Kingdom	The ship ran aground and was wrecked off Chance Harbour, Nova Scotia British North America.
Helena	Belgium	The ship was wrecked at Southport. She was on a voyage from Liverpool, Lancashire to Ostend, West Flanders.
Jessie	(United Kingdom of Great Britain and Ireland) British North America	T. She was on a voyage from Pictou, Nova Scotia to Kingston upon Hull, Yorkshire.
Junge Gertje	Kingdom of Hanover	The ship sank off Fidderswardersiel. Her crew were rescued. She was on a voyage from Carolinensiel to Bremen.
Lion	United Kingdom	The paddle steamer capsized and was abandoned at Fleetwood, Lancashire. She was on a voyage from Liverpool to Londonderry.
Maria	Bremen	The ship was wrecked on Sylt, Duchy of Holstein. Her crew were rescued. She was on a voyage from Christiansand, Norway to Bremen.
Mary	United Kingdom	The ship was driven ashore at "Dugg", Cumberland. She was on a voyage from Whitehaven, cumberland to Dublin.
San José	Portugal	The schooner was wrecked on the Vogel Sand, in the North Sea with the loss of four of her nine crew. She was on a voyage from Lisbon to Hamburg.

== 9 October ==
List of shipwrecks: 9 October 1850
Ship	State	Description
Eleanor'	United Kingdom	The brig ran aground and sank off Ameland, Friesland, Netherlands with the loss of eight of the twelve people on board. She was on a voyage from Sunderland, County Durham to Amsterdam, North Holland, Netherlands.
Jube	Norway	The ship was driven ashore near the western entrance to the Agger Canal, Denmark. She was on a voyage from Christiana to Honfleur, Calvados, France.
Majalcofar	Spain	The barque ran aground off Søndervig, Denmark and was wrecked with the loss of two of her fifteen crew. She was on a voyage from Havana, Cuba to Danzig.
Myrtle	United Kingdom	The ship was abandoned in the North Sea 30 nautical miles (56 km) off Heligoland. Her crew were rescued. She was on a voyage from Fraserburgh, Aberdeenshire to Bremen. Myrtle came ashore on the coast of Denmark in a derelict condition on 10 October.
Normen	Norway	The barque foundered in the North Sea. Her crew were rescued by Graf von Krassau (Prussia). Normen was on a voyage from Narva, Russia to Amsterdam.
Princess	United Kingdom	The ship was driven ashore and wrecked on "Fideltring". Norway. Her crew were rescued.
Woodville	United Kingdom	The ship struck the quayside and sank at Whitehaven, Cumberland. She was on a voyage from Dublin to Whitehaven. She was refloated.

== 10 October ==
List of shipwrecks: 10 October 1850
Ship	State	Description
Enterprise	United Kingdom	The brig was wrecked on the Kentish Knock. Her ten crew were rescued. She was on a voyage from Newcastle upon Tyne, Northumberland to London.
Filomena	United Kingdom	The ship was driven ashore near the mouth of the Ebro. She was on a voyage from Tarragona, Spain to Liverpool, Lancashire.
Jeune Marie	France	The ship collided with Kate Howe (United States) and sank in the Bristol Channel 9 nautical miles (17 km) west south west of Nash Point, Glamorgan, United Kingdom. Her crew were rescued. She was on a voyage from Cardiff, Glamorgan to Rochefort, Charente-Maritime.
John Ellis	United Kingdom	The ship was wrecked at Pwllheli, Caernarfonshire. She was on a voyage from Liverpool to Barmouth, Merionethshire.
Kusto	Norway	The schooner was driven ashore near "Rin", Denmark. Her crew were rescued. She was on a voyage from Christianstad to London.
Mazarine	United Kingdom	The ship collided with the quayside, stove her anchor through her bow, and sank at Dublin. She was refloated the next day.
Susannah	United Kingdom	The schooner was driven ashore and wrecked at Thurso, Caithness.

== 11 October ==
List of shipwrecks: 11 October 1850
Ship	State	Description
Constitution	Norway	The ship was driven ashore and wrecked 3 nautical miles (5.6 km) west of Calais, France. Her crew were rescued. She was on a voyage from South Shields, County Durham, United Kingdom to Venice, Kingdom of Lombardy–Venetia.
Derwent	United Kingdom	The ship was driven ashore on the Goodwick Sands, Pembrokeshire. She was on a voyage from Quebec City, Province of Canada, British North America to Workington, Cumberland. She was refloated on 2 November and resumed her voyage.
Elizabeth	United Kingdom	The ship ran aground on the Barber Sand, in the North Sea off the coast of Suffolk. She was on a voyage from Teignmouth, Devon to Aberdeen. She was refloated the next day and taken in to Lowestoft, Suffolk in a leaky condition.
Enigheten	Sweden	The sloop was wrecked on Hufondskar. Her crew were rescued. She was on a voyage from Gotland to Stockholm.
Louisa Margharetta	United Kingdom	The ship was driven ashore in the Dardanelles. She was on a voyage from London to Constantinople, Ottoman Empire. She was refloated.
Martin, and Syria	Spain	The steamship Martin and her tow, the barque Syria were driven ashore at Gibraltar. They were refloated and proceeded on their voyage to Cádiz.
Olof Kyrre	Sweden	The ship was driven ashore and wrecked at Holm. Her crew were rescued. She was on a voyage from Skellefteå to Kingston upon Hull, Yorkshire, United Kingdom.
Union	United Kingdom	The ship struck the quayside, drove her anchor through her bow, and sank at Bridlington, Yorkshire. She was on a voyage from Peterhead, Aberdeenshire to Rotterdam, South Holland, Netherlands.
Woodman	United Kingdom	The ship was driven ashore at Hartlepool, County Durham. She was on a voyage from Quebec City, Province of Canada, British North America to Sunderland, County Durham.

== 12 October ==
List of shipwrecks: 12 October 1850
Ship	State	Description
Alliance	Sweden	The schooner was driven ashore and wrecked at Grainthorpe, Lincolnshire, United Kingdom. She was on a voyage from Stockholm to Fosdyke Bridge, Lincolnshire.
Apollo	United Kingdom	The ship ran aground and was wrecked at "Barbersport", Ottoman Empire.
Eugene	France	The ship ran aground at Great Yarmouth, Norfolk, United Kingdom. She was on a voyage from "Peroque" to Newcastle upon Tyne, Northumberland, United Kingdom. She was refloated and taken in to Great Yarmouth in a leaky condition.
HMS Gossamer	Royal Navy	The cutter was driven ashore at Grimsby, Lincolnshire.
Industry	United Kingdom	The ship was driven ashore and wrecked in Llandudno Bay.
John	United Kingdom	The ship was driven ashore and wrecked in Llandudno Bay.
Raven	(United Kingdom of Great Britain and Ireland) New South Wales	The steamship was wrecked in Trial Bay. She was on a voyage from Sydney to Moreton Bay.

== 13 October ==
List of shipwrecks: 13 October 1850
Ship	State	Description
Ceylon	United Kingdom	The ship was wrecked at Adelaide, South Australia with the loss of one life.
Emma Clay	United Kingdom	The Thames barge was run into and sunk at Northfleet, Kent by a collier brig with the loss of two of the four people on board.
Grecian	United Kingdom	The barque was wrecked off Port Adelaide, South Australia with the loss of one life. She was on a voyage from London to Port Adelaide.
Hannah Eddy	United States	The ship struck a sunken rock in the Gaspar Strait. She was abandoned the next day in a sinking condition. Her crew were rescued by Ganges (United Kingdom). Hannah Eddy was on a voyage from Boston, Massachusetts to Hong Kong.
Hoop	Netherlands	The ship was driven ashore on Rømø, Denmark. She was on a voyage from Aarhus, Denmark to the Maas (French: Meuse).
Pezo de Regoa	United Kingdom	The ship was departed from Liverpool for the Charente. No further trace, presumed foundered with the loss of all hands.
Trois Frères	France	The ship was driven ashore at Boulogne. She was on a voyage from Newcastle upon Tyne, Northumberland, United Kingdom to Bordeaux, Gironde.

== 14 October ==
List of shipwrecks: 14 October 1850
Ship	State	Description
Beurs van Schiedam	Netherlands	The ship was driven ashore at Gibraltar. She was on a voyage from La Spezia, Kingdom of the Two Sicilies to Saint Petersburg, Russia. She was refloated the next day with assistance from HMS Dragon (Royal Navy) and taken in to Gibraltar.
Engelina	Heligoland	The ship was wrecked on Langeoog, Kingdom of Hanover. She was on a voyage from Rüstersiel to Newcastle upon Tyne, Northumberland, United Kingdom.
Kate	United Kingdom	The barque was wrecked on Manapand Point, India. Her crew were rescued. She was on a voyage from Colombo, Ceylon to Madras, India.
Lady Flora	Malta	The brig was struck by a waterspout and foundered in the Mediterranean Sea 30 nautical miles (56 km) west of Gozo with the loss of nine of her ten crew. The survivor was rescued by the brig Il Maltese (Malta). Lady Flora was on a voyage from Valletta to Livorno, Grand Duchy of Tuscany.
San Antonio	Spain	The full-rigged ship was abandoned in the Mediterranean Sea. She was on a voyage from Palma de Mallorca to Toulon, Var, France.
Sarah Berry	United Kingdom	The ship was driven ashore and wrecked at Bolderāja, Russia.
Susannah	United Kingdom	The ship ran aground and was damaged at Memel, Prussia. She was on a voyage from Newcastle upon Tyne, Northumberland to Memel.
Uva	United Kingdom	The brig ran aground off Hamra, Gotland, Sweden. She was on a voyage from Troon, Ayrshire to Saint Petersburg, Russia. She was refloated and put in to "Stete" for repairs.
Wave	(United Kingdom of Great Britain and Ireland) New South Wales	The schooner was driven ashore at Belfast. All on board were rescued. She had been refloated by 17 October and proceeded for Melbourne.
William and Ann	United Kingdom	The brig ran aground on the Fahrludden, off the coast of Sweden. She was refloated but was consequently beached near Östergarn, Gotland. She floated off the next day and foundered. Her crew were rescued.

== 15 October ==
List of shipwrecks: 15 October 1850
Ship	State	Description
Aimable Felix	France	The ship was wrecked near Cape San Antonio, Spain. She was on a voyage from Cette, Hérault to Nantes, Loire-Inférieure.
Corriere dei Due Amici	Grand Duchy of Tuscany	The brig was wrecked in the Gulf of Catania. All on board, more than 50 people, were rescued. She was on a voyage from Malta to Livorno and Tripoli, Ottoman Tripolitania.
Elizabeth	United Kingdom	The ship was driven ashore on Ameland, Friesland, Netherlands. She was on a voyage from Holbæk, Denmark to London.
Maria Isabel	Portugal	The ship ran aground on the Haisborough Sands, in the North Sea off the coast of Norfolk, United Kingdom. She was on a voyage from Newcastle upon Tyne, Northumberland, United Kingdom to Lisbon. She was refloated and taken in to Great Yarmouth, Norfolk in a waterlogged condition.
Negocio di Due Amici	Grand Duchy of Tuscany	The brig was wrecked in the Bay of Catania. All on board were rescued. She was on a voyage from "Bengosi" to Livorno.
Phantom	United Kingdom	The schooner was wrecked on the Bolax Rocks, in the Baltic Sea off the coast of the Grand Duchy of Finland. Four of her eight crew were reported missing. She was on a voyage from Leith, Lothian to Saint Petersburg, Russia.

== 16 October ==
List of shipwrecks: 16 October 1850
Ship	State	Description
Barbara	United Kingdom	The ship was damaged by fire at Lindisfarne, Northumberland. She was on a voyage from South Sunderland, County Durham to Montrose, Forfarshire.
Carl Emil	Stettin	The ship was wrecked 5 nautical miles (9.3 km) north of Libava, Courland Governorate. Her crew were rescued. She was on a voyage from Stettin to Riga, Russia.
Jane	United Kingdom	The ship sprang a leak whilst on a voyage from Saint Domingo to London. She put in to Bermuda, where she was condemned.
Mary and Elizabeth	United Kingdom	The ship ran aground on the Cutler Sand, in the North Sea off the coast of Suffolk. She was on a voyage from South Shields, County Durham to Rye, Sussex.

== 17 October ==
List of shipwrecks: 17 October 1850
Ship	State	Description
Chamberlin	United Kingdom	The sloop ran aground on Taylor's Bank, in Liverpool Bay. Her crew were rescued. She was later refloated and towed in to Lytham St. Annes, Lancashire.
Fifeshire	United Kingdom	The sloop was wrecked on the Burbo Bank, in Liverpool Bay. Her crew were rescued.
Genova	United Kingdom	The steamship ran aground on the Piano Bank, off Livorno, Grand Duchy of Tuscany. She was on a voyage from Liverpool, Lancashire to Livorno. She was refloated.
Lucretia	Greece	The brig was wrecked on a reef off Cape Skala, Beylik of Tunis. She was on a voyage from Patras to an English port.
Providence	United Kingdom	The ship was driven ashore and wrecked east of Lossiemouth, Lothian. She was on a voyage from the Firth of Forth to Gardenstown, Aberdeenshire.
Wicherdina	Prussia	The ship was driven ashore on the coast of Jutland. Her crew were rescued. She was on a voyage from Wolgast to Rotterdam, South Holland, Netherlands.

== 18 October ==
List of shipwrecks: 18 October 1850
Ship	State	Description
Eole	United Kingdom	The ship foundered off the Dudgeon Sandbank, in the North Sea. her crew were rescued. She was on a voyage from Blyth, Northumberland to Nantes, Loire-Inférieure, France.
Hegermann	Flag unknown	The ship foundered off Frederiksvern, Norway.
Kalama	Kingdom of Hawaii	This brigantine went ashore on the reef near the entrance to Honolulu harbour.
Luna	United Kingdom	The ship ran aground on the Holm Sand, in the North Sea off the coast of Suffolk. She was on a voyage from Arkhangelsk, Russia to London.

== 19 October ==
List of shipwrecks: 19 October 1850
Ship	State	Description
Dædalus	United Kingdom	The ship ran aground on the London Chest, in the Baltic Sea. She was on a voyage from Grangemouth, Stirlingshire to Kronstadt, Russia. She was refloated and towed in to Kronstadt.
Union	United Kingdom	The ship was driven ashore west of Wells-next-the-Sea, Norfolk. She was on a voyage from South Shields, County Durham to London.

== 20 October ==
List of shipwrecks: 20 October 1850
Ship	State	Description
Adario	United States	The barque was wrecked on a reef off "Opulu". Her crew were rescued. She was on a voyage from San Francisco, California to Sydney, New South Wales.
Henry	United Kingdom	The ship was wrecked on the east coast of Læsø, Denmark. She was on a voyage from Kronstadt, Russia to Great Yarmouth, Norfolk.
James Andus	United Kingdom	The ship foundered off the "Western Isles". Her crew took to the boats. They were rescued on 24 October by Pearl (United Kingdom). James Andus was on a voyage from Newport to Baltimore, Maryland, United States.
Norham Castle	United Kingdom	The ship was driven ashore and severely damaged on the south east coast of Læsø. She was on a voyage from Saint Petersburg, Russia to London. She was refloated on 24 October.
Sally	United Kingdom	The schooner departed from Jersey, Channel Islands for Glasgow, Renfrewshire. She subsequently foundered. Her crew were rescued.
Tees	United Kingdom	The ship was driven ashore at Spittal, Northumberland. She was on a voyage from Middlesbrough, Yorkshire to Arbroath, Forfarshire. She was refloated.

== 21 October ==
List of shipwrecks: 21 October 1850
Ship	State	Description
Dunnotter Castle	United Kingdom	The ship was driven ashore at Kettleness, Yorkshire. She was refloated and taken in to Whitby, Yorkshire.
Elbe	United Kingdom	The schooner was driven ashore at Great Yarmouth, Norfolk. She was on a voyage from London to Seaham, County Durham.
Faedreslander	(Russian Empire) Grand Duchy of Finland	The ship was driven ashore and wrecked near Fårösund, Sweden. She was on a voyage from Lübeck to Åland.
Lady of the Lake	United Kingdom	The schooner was driven ashore at Great Yarmouth, Norfolk. She was on a voyage from London to Seaham, County Durham. She was refloated on 4 November and towed in to Great Yarmouth in a leaky condition.

== 22 October ==
List of shipwrecks: 22 October 1850
Ship	State	Description
Abeldina	Bremen	The ship was driven ashore at Cuxhaven. Her crew were rescued. She was on a voyage from Bremerhaven to Stettin.
Agnes William	United Kingdom	The schooner was driven ashore and wrecked at Ballina, County Mayo.
Diligence	United Kingdom	The ship collided with Argo (United Kingdom) and sank off Rockcliffe, Yorkshire. Her crew were rescued by Argo.
Falconer	United Kingdom	The ship ran aground on the Whitby Rock. She was refloated and taken in to Whitby, Yorkshire.
Generous	United Kingdom	The ship ran aground and capsized in the River Witham at Boston, Lincolnshire. She was on a voyage from Riga, Russia to Boston. She was refloated on 25 October.
Hydrus	United Kingdom	The ship ran aground near Brielle, South Holland, Netherlands. She was on a voyage from Hellevoetsluis, Zeeland, Netherlands to Hartlepool, County Durham. She was later refloated, and subsequently put in to Hartlepool, County Durham.
Mary Bulmer	United Kingdom	The barque was wrecked on Great Wass Island, Maine, United States. She was on a voyage from New Haven, Connecticut, United States to Saint John, New Brunswick, British North America.
Minden	United Kingdom	The ship was driven ashore at Punta Mala Spain. She was on a voyage from Odesa to Cork or Falmouth, Cornwall. She was refloated with assistance from HMS Janus (Royal Navy) and taken in to Gibraltar.
Richard Cobden	United Kingdom	The ship was destroyed by fire 100 nautical miles (190 km) off Réunion. Prince of Orange (United Kingdom) rescued the crew. Richard Cobden was on a voyage from Calcutta, India to London.
Thetis	United Kingdom	The ship was in collision with the schooner Shepherd (United Kingdom) and capsized in the English Channel 7 nautical miles (13 km) south of Mullion Island, Cornwall. Her crew were rescued by Shepherd. Thetis was on a voyage from Falmouth, Cornwall to Liverpool, Lancashire, United Kingdom.
Uranie	France	The ship ran aground and was severely damaged at South Shields, County Durham, United Kingdom. She was on a voyage from Havre de Grâce, Seine-Inférieure to South Shields. She was refloated.

== 23 October ==
List of shipwrecks: 23 October 1850
Ship	State	Description
Henry	United Kingdom	The sloop was driven ashore at Great Yarmouth, Norfolk.
Nir-i Şevket	Ottoman Navy	The ship of the line caught fire and was destroyed by the explosion of her powder magazine at Constantinople. There were about 200 survivors. In excess of 900 lives were lost.
Snowdrop	United Kingdom	The ship struck the pier and was severely damaged at Ramsgate, Kent. She was on a voyage from Rotterdam, South Holland, Netherlands to Liverpool, Lancashire.

== 24 October ==
List of shipwrecks: 24 October 1850
Ship	State	Description
Amelia	Grand Duchy of Tuscany	The steamship was run down and sunk in the Adriatic Sea by an Austrian steamship. All on board were rescued.
Ellen	(United Kingdom of Great Britain and Ireland) Guernsey	The ship was driven ashore at Gibraltar. She was on a voyage from Málaga, Spain to London. She was refloated on 29 October and subsequently resumed her voyage.
Erin	United Kingdom	The ship was driven ashore south of Bridlington, Yorkshire. Her crew were rescued. She was refloated on 3 November.
Graces	United Kingdom	The ship was driven ashore south of Bridlington. Her crew were rescued. She was on a voyage from London to South Shields, County Durham She was refloated on 3 November.
Jane	United Kingdom	The sloop was wrecked on the Black Middens, off the coast of County Durham. Her crew were rescued by the North Shields Lifeboat. She was on a voyage from Perth to London.
Keltie	United Kingdom	The ship was driven ashore south of Bridlington. Her crew were rescued. She was on a voyage from Goole, Yorkshire to Beadnell, Northumberland. She was refloated on 3 November.
Margaret	United Kingdom	The brig ran aground on the North Bank, in Liverpool Bay. She was refloated.
Margaret	United Kingdom	The ship ran aground off Anholt, Denmark. She was on a voyage from Saint Petersburg, Russia to Truro, Cornwall. She was abandoned the next day and sank on 26 October.
Solon	Greece	The brig ran aground on the St. Elmo Rock, 9 nautical miles (17 km) north of Cape Carbonara, Sardinia and sank. Her crew were rescued. She was on a voyage from Galaţi, Ottoman Empire to Cork or Falmouth, Cornwall.
Tintern	United Kingdom	The screw steamer ran aground on the Briggs, off he coast of County Down. She was on a voyage from Greenock, Renfrewshire to San Francisco, California, United States. Tintern was refloated and put in to Belfast, County Antrim in a leaky condition and was beached.
Vesta	United Kingdom	The ship foundered in the Atlantic Ocean (47°30′N 8°30′W). Her crew were rescued by Zuleika (United Kingdom). Vesta was on a voyage from Cartagena, Spain to Porto, Portugal, London and Newcastle upon Tyne, Northumberland.
Zephyr	United Kingdom	The ship was sighted in the Øresund whilst on a voyage from Stettin to Glasgow, Renfrewshire. She subsequently foundered before 13 December with the loss of all hands.

== 25 October ==
List of shipwrecks: 26 October 1850
Ship	State	Description
Arrow	United Kingdom	The ship was wrecked 12 nautical miles (22 km) north of Aviero, Portugal with the loss of two of her crew. She was on a voyage from Saint John's, Newfoundland, British North America to Figueira da Foz, Portugal. The wreck was plundered by the local inhabitants.
Aurora	Norway	The brig was driven ashore and wrecked at Hartlepool, County Durham, United Kingdom. Her crew were rescued. She was on a voyage from Honfleur, Calvados, France to Newcastle upon Tyne, Northumberland, United Kingdom.
Francis	United Kingdom	The ship ran aground in the River Tees and was damaged. She was refloated and taken in to Middlesbrough, Yorkshire in a leaky condition.
Heergina Geordina	Netherlands	The galiot was driven ashore south of Sunderland, County Durham, United Kingdom. She was on a voyage from Amsterdam, North Holland to Newcastle upon Tyne. She was refloated on 5 November and was towed in to Sunderland in a severely damaged condition.
Johana Friedrich	Bremen	The barque was wrecked on the Gunfleet Sand, in the North Sea off the coast of Essex, United Kingdom. All 156 people on board were rescued by the smacks Benevolence, Eagle, Elizabeth, Louisa and Mary (all United Kingdom) and other vessels. Johana Friedrich was on a voyage from Bremen to Charleston, South Carolina, United States.
Lucy	United Kingdom	The ship was sighted in the Øresund whilst on a voyage from Danzig to Kingston upon Hull, Yorkshire. No further trace, presumed foundered with the loss of all hands.
Lykkens Prove	Denmark	The schooner was driven ashore at Zingst, Prussia. Her crew were rescued. She was on a voyage from Copenhagen to "Suendbay".
Martin	Hudson's Bay Company	The ship was wrecked at Tub Harbour, Labrador, British North America with the loss of all but one of her crew.
Viconta	Spain	The ship foundered off Luanco. Her crew were rescued. She was on a voyage from London, United Kingdom to Gijón.

== 26 October ==
List of shipwrecks: 26 October 1850
Ship	State	Description
Chase	United Kingdom	The ship was wrecked on Anholt, Denmark. She was on a voyage from Memel, Prussia to London.
Louisa Carolina	(Russian Empire) Grand Duchy of Finland	The ship was driven ashore and wrecked on the east coast of Gotland, Sweden. Her crew were rescued. She was on a voyage from St. Ubes, Portugal to Stockholm, Sweden.
Mary	United Kingdom	The ship departed from Nantes, Loire-Inférieure for Limerick. No further trace, presumed foundered with the loss of all hands.
Robert	Sweden	The ship was driven ashore near Slito.

== 27 October ==
List of shipwrecks: 27 October 1850
Ship	State	Description
Alida	France	The ship ran aground and was severely damaged on the Ower Sand, in the North Sea. She was on a voyage from Christiansand, Norway to Havre de Grâce, Seine-Inférieure. She was refloated and taken in to Great Yarmouth, Norfolk, United Kingdom.
Antioch	United Kingdom	The ship was driven ashore on Clee Ness, Lincolnshire. She was on a voyage from Sunderland, County Durham to London. She was refloated and taken in to Grimsby, Lincolnshire in a leaky condition.
Carl Eduard	Danzig	The ship was driven ashore on Gotland, Sweden. She was on a voyage from Saint Petersburg to Riga, Russia.
Courrier d'Abreville	France	The ship ran aground at South Shields, County Durham. She was on a voyage from Antwerp, Belgium to South Shields.
Cumberland	United Kingdom	The schooner was driven ashore at Formby, Lancashire and was abandoned by her crew, who were rescued. She was on a voyage from Luçon, Vendée, France to Liverpool, Lancashire.
Elisha Thayer	United Kingdom	The ship was driven ashore between Hurst Castle and Pennington, Hampshire. She was on a voyage from Queenstown, County Cork to Newhaven, Sussex. She was refloated on 31 October and resumed her voyage.
Francis	United Kingdom	The ship ran aground at Stockton-on-Tees, County Durham. She was refloated and put in to Middlesbrough, Yorkshire in a leaky condition.
Harmony	(United Kingdom of Great Britain and Ireland) British North America	The ship was driven ashore at Arichat, Nova Scotia.
Jufvrouw Hendrika	Netherlands	The ship was sighted in the Øresund whilst on a voyage from Riga, Russia to Groningen. No further trace, presumed foundered with the loss of all hands.
Mary Hudson	United Kingdom	The ship ran aground in the Cross Channel. She was on a voyage from Saint Petersburg, Russia to King's Lynn, Norfolk. She was refloated on 30 October.
Powerful	United Kingdom	The steam tug was wrecked on the Longsand, in the North Sea off the coast of Essex. Her crew were rescued.
Vrouw Dienke	Netherlands	The ship ran aground on the Cross Sand, in the North Sea off the coast of Norfolk. She was on a voyage from Workum, Friesland to London. She was refloated and put in to Great Yarmouth in a leaky condition.

== 28 October ==
List of shipwrecks: 28 October 1850
Ship	State	Description
Favourite	United Kingdom	The ship was driven ashore and wrecked near Warrenpoint, County Antrim. She was on a voyage from Warrenpoint to Larne.
Groningen	Netherlands	The ship was wrecked on a reef off Laboe, Prussia. Her crew were rescued.
Industry	United Kingdom	The ship was driven ashore and wrecked near Bude, Cornwall. She was on a voyage from Yarmouth, Isle of Wight to Bristol, Gloucestershire.
Mercy	United Kingdom	The ship was wrecked on the Salno Reef, in the Baltic Sea north east of Fårö, Sweden. Her crew survived. She was on a voyage from Saint Petersburg, Russia to London.
Ozai	France	The schooner foundered in the North Sea 40 nautical miles (74 km) east of Yorkshire, United Kingdom. Her crew were rescued by the fishing vessel Robert and Mary (United Kingdom). Ozai was on a voyage from Newcastle upon Tyne, Northumberland, United Kingdom to Alexandria, Egypt.
William	United Kingdom	The brig was wrecked on the Corton Sand, in the North Sea off the coast of Suffolk.

== 29 October ==
List of shipwrecks: 29 October 1850
Ship	State	Description
Defiance	United Kingdom	The ship ran aground and was wrecked off Öland. Sweden. She was on a voyage from Kronstadt, Russia to Lowestoft, Suffolk.
Heave	United Kingdom	The brig ran aground on the Horse Bank, in the Irish Sea off the coast of Lancashire. Her crew were rescued.
Helix	United Kingdom	The ship was wrecked on the Salthouse Bank, in the Irish Sea off the coast of Lancashire. She was on a voyage from Newport, Monmouthshire to Liverpool, Lancashire.
Nina	United Kingdom	The ship struck the Rothskar Rocks and was beached in Casperwick Bay. She was on a voyage from Saint Petersburg, Russia to London. She was refloated on 1 November and taken in to Reval, Russia for repairs.
Torch	United Kingdom	The ship was driven ashore and wrecked at Torremolinos, Spain. She was on a voyage from Çeşme, Ottoman Empire to Hamburg.

== 30 October ==
List of shipwrecks: 30 October 1850
Ship	State	Description
Amazon	United Kingdom	The ship departed from South Shields, County Durham for a Dutch port. No further trace, presumed foundered with the loss of all hands.
Betsey	United Kingdom	The sloop foundered off the Isle of Arran with the loss of all hands, at least three lives. She was on a voyage from Ayr to Belfast, County Antrim.
Calliope	Russia	The ship ran aground on the Bartholomew Ledges. She was consequently beached near the Woolpack Battery, in the Isles of Scilly, United Kingdom where she was wrecked. She was on a voyage from Odesa to Falmouth, Cornwall, United Kingdom.

== 31 October ==
List of shipwrecks: 31 October 1850
Ship	State	Description
Cumberland	United Kingdom	The brig was wrecked at Kilnsea, Yorkshire with the loss of her captain. Four crew were rescued by the Spurn Lifeboat, which lost a crew member effecting the rescue. The remaining four crew were rescued the next day by rocket apparatus. She was on a voyage from Newcastle upon Tyne, Northumberland to London.
Effort	United Kingdom	The ship was driven ashore at Wells-next-the-Sea, Norfolk. She was on a voyage from South Shields, County Durham to Bordeaux, Gironde, France. She was refloated.
Fanny	United Kingdom	The ship was driven ashore at Kronstadt, Russia. She was on a voyage from Kronstadt to Kingston upon Hull, Yorkshire. She was refloated and towed in to Kronstadt.
Hexham	United Kingdom	The ship was driven ashore at Fiskars, Finland. Her crew were rescued. She was on a voyage from "Wyburg" to Kingston upon Hull. She had become a wreck by 19 November.
Providence	United Kingdom	The schooner sprang a leak and was beached at Grimsby, Lincolnshire. She was on a voyage from Ipswich, Suffolk to Sunderland, County Durham.
Thomas Pearson	United States	The ship ran aground on the Douglas Reef. She was on a voyage from New York to Belize City, British Honduras. She was refloated and taken in to Belize City, where she was condemned.
Yar	United Kingdom	The ship was driven ashore at Whitby, Yorkshire. She was refloated and resumed her voyage.

== Unknown date ==
List of shipwrecks: Unknown date in October 1850
Ship	State	Description
Abbotsford	United Kingdom	The ship was abandoned in the Atlantic Ocean. Her crew were rescued. She was on a voyage from Newport, Monmouthshire to Quebec City, Province of Canada, British North America.
Aetna	United Kingdom	The brig ran aground off Helsingør, Denmark. She was on a voyage from Newcastle upon Tyne, Northumberland to Stettin. She was refloated on 23 October and resumed her voyage.
Arno	United Kingdom	The ship was driven ashore at Whitstable, Kent. She was on a voyage from Algoa Bay to London. She was refloated on 7 October.
Captain Cook	(United Kingdom of Great Britain and Ireland) New South Wales	The schooner was wrecked off Cape Grant before 15 October. Her crew were rescued. She was on a voyage from Circular Head to Adelaide, South Australia.
Comblun	Prussia	The ship struck a rock at Lochboisdale, South Uist, Outer Hebrides before 1 November. She was on a voyage from Memel to Sligo, United Kingdom. She was consequently condemned.
Constitution	United Kingdom	The ship was lost in the Adriatic Sea off Brindisi, Kingdom of the Two Sicilies. She was on a voyage from Trieste to Pernambuco, Brazil.
Elizabeth	Russia	The ship foundered in the North Sea off Juist, Kingdom of Hanover before 23 October.
George Lockwood	United Kingdom	The ship was foundered in the Atlantic Ocean east of the Grand Banks of Newfoundland with the loss of all but one of her crew.
Gertruida	Netherlands	The ship foundered off the Dutch coast before 29 October.
Grace	United Kingdom	The ship was driven ashore at Workington, Cumberland. She was refloated on 24 October and taken in to Workington.
Heironimus	Stralsund	The ship was wrecked on the coast of Sweden. Her crew were rescued. She was on a voyage from Stalsund to London, United Kingdom.
Henry and Jane	United Kingdom	The ship was abandoned in the Atlantic Ocean before 19 October. Her crew were rescued by HNLMS Suriname (Royal Netherlands Navy). Henry and Jane was on a voyage from Irvine, Ayrshire to Gibraltar.
Hydrus	United Kingdom	The ship was driven ashore near Brielle, South Holland, Netherlands. She was refloated.
Kite	United Kingdom	The barque was wrecked near Tuticorin, India.
Leuwen	Norway	The barque sprang a leak whilst on a voyage from Härnösand, Sweden to Nantes, Loire-Inférieure, France. She was taken in to Norrköping, Sweden in a sinking condition.
Margaretha	Kingdom of Hanover	The ship was driven ashore near Carolinensiel. She was on a voyage from Carolinensiel to Grangemouth, Stirlingshire, United Kingdom.
Marianne	United Kingdom	The ship was driven ashore at South Shields. She was on a voyage from South Shields to Naples, Kingdom of the Two Sicilies. She was refloated on 25 October.
Mary	United Kingdom	The ship was driven ashore at Whitehaven, Cumberland. She was on a voyage from Whitehaven to Dublin. She was refloated on 21 October and taken in to Whitehaven in a leaky condition.
Mary Ann	United Kingdom	The ship was driven ashore at Deal, Kent. She was refloated on 8 October.
Mary Hudson	United Kingdom	The ship was driven ashore at King's Lynn, Norfolk. She was refloated on 30 October.
Mary Jane	United Kingdom	The ship was abandoned in the Atlantic Ocean (43°22′N 45°41′W) before 25 October.
Messenger	United Kingdom	The ship was destroyed by fire. She was on a voyage from Saint John, New Brunswick to Liverpool. The wreck was towed in to Sheep Island, Nova Scotia.
Mountaineer	United Kingdom	The schooner was abandoned in the Atlantic Ocean before 20 October. She was discovered on that day by Canopus ( (United Kingdom of Great Britain and Ireland) Jersey) and was taken in to Jersey, where sh arrived on 5 November.
Nordsejemen	Sweden	The ship was wrecked at Kappelshamn, Gotland.
Palendar	United Kingdom	The ship was abandoned in the Atlantic Ocean (42°45′N 45°35′W). Her crew were rescued by Courier (France). Palendar was on a voyage from Porto, Portugal to Glasgow, Renfrewshire.
Reliance	United Kingdom	The ship caught fire in the Davis Strait before 31 October and was scuttled. Her crew were rescued by a Danish vessel.
Serapis	United Kingdom	The ship was abandoned in the Irish Sea. She was on a voyage from Cardiff, Glamorgan to Waterford. She was towed in to Waterford on 7 October.
Themis	Stettin	The brig was abandoned in the North Sea. She was on a voyage from Danzig to Amsterdam, North Holland, Netherlands. She was taken in to Heligoland on 11 October in a derelict condition.
Venture	United Kingdom	The brig was abandoned in the Atlantic Ocean before 1 November.
William and Agnes	United Kingdom	The ship was driven ashore and wrecked at Ballina, County Mayo before 27 October.
