= List of shipwrecks in July 1849 =

The list of shipwrecks in July 1849 includes ships sunk, foundered, wrecked, grounded, or otherwise lost during July 1849.

== 1 July ==
List of shipwrecks: 1 July 1849
Ship	State	Description
Benonai	France	The ship struck the Moines Rocks, west of Le Conquet, Finistère and sank. Her crew were rescued. She was on a voyage from Seaham, County Durham, United Kingdom to Brest, Finistère.
Dolphin	United Kingdom	The sloop was driven ashore and wrecked at "Leggan", Isle of Mull, Inner Hebrides. Her crew were rescued.
Emma Searle	United States	The ship was driven ashore near the West Quoddy Head Lighthouse, Maine. She was on a voyage from Saint John, New Brunswick, British North America to Bristol, Connecticut. She was refloated and towed in to Saint John.
H. B.	United Kingdom	The barque ran aground at the mouth of the Columbia River. She was refloated.
Stirlingshire	United Kingdom	The ship ran aground and was severely damaged at Liverpool, Lancashire. She was on a voyage from Mobile, Alabama, United States to Liverpool. She was refloated.
Walpole	United Kingdom	The full-rigged ship ran aground at the mouth of the Columbia River and was damaged. She was refloated.

== 2 July ==
List of shipwrecks: 2 July 1849
Ship	State	Description
Sarah Arsilia	United Kingdom	The ship foundered in the Atlantic Ocean. Fifteen of her crew were rescued. She was on a voyage from Newport, Monmouthshire to Boston, Massachusetts, United States.
Treasurer	United Kingdom	The ship was driven ashore and severely damaged near Westport, County Mayo. She was on a voyage from Westport to Puerto Rico. She was refloated and taken in to Westport.

== 3 July ==
List of shipwrecks: 3 July 1849
Ship	State	Description
Anglo American	United Kingdom	The brigantine was driven ashore at the Quinta Palermo, Argentina.
Ann	United Kingdom	The brig ran aground on the Little Burbo Bank, in Liverpool Bay and was abandoned by her crew. She was on a voyage from a port in Caithness to Constantinople, Ottoman Empire. She was refloated and taken in to Liverpool, Lancashire.
Johns	United Kingdom	The ship was wrecked at St. Margarets Bay, Kent. Her crew were rescued. She was on a voyage from Hartlepool, County Durham to St. Margarets Bay.
Margaretha Magdalena	Hamburg	The ship was driven ashore on the "Eilander Bult". Her crew were rescued. She was on a voyage from Hartlepool to Hamburg.
North Durham	United Kingdom	The ship was wrecked on Fårö, Sweden. Her crew were rescued. She was on a voyage from Riga, Russia to Sunderland, County Durham.

== 4 July ==
List of shipwrecks: 4 July 1849
Ship	State	Description
Ann Henzell	United Kingdom	The ship was driven ashore at Liverpool, Lancashire and was abandoned by her crew. She was on a voyage from Constantinople, Ottoman Empire to Liverpool. She was refloated and taken in to Liverpool.
Barrhill	United Kingdom	The ship was driven ashore at "Itamarica", Brazil. She was on a voyage from Liverpool to Pernambuco, Brazil. She was refloated.
John Bright	United Kingdom	The ship ran aground in the Sea of Marmora off Contali Island, Ottoman Empire. She was on a voyage from the Danube to a British port. She was refloated.
Oliver van Noord	Netherlands	The ship was wrecked on the Banjaard Sand, in the North Sea. She was on a voyage from Banjoewangie, Netherlands East Indies to Rotterdam, South Holland.
SMS Vulcano	(Austrian Empire) Austrian Navy	The paddle steamer ran aground off Malamocco, Kingdom of Lombardy–Venetia and came under fire from Manfrin Fort with the loss of a crew member. She was refloated the next day with assistance from SMS Custoza ( Austrian Navy), Cartatone and Dorotea (both Austrian Empire) and eliminated the artillery.

== 5 July ==
List of shipwrecks: 5 July 1849
Ship	State	Description
Carl Johan	Norway	The ship was wrecked on the Outer Scheeren Sandbank. Her crew were rescued.
Chatham	United States	The ship was in collision with Corea (United Kingdom) and sank in the Atlantic Ocean (42°58′N 48°10′W). Her crew were rescued by Corea. Chatham was on a voyage from New York to Cork, United Kingdom.

== 6 July ==
List of shipwrecks: 6 July 1849
Ship	State	Description
Caledonia	United Kingdom	The ship struck a rock off the Rabbit islands, Ottoman Empire. She was consequently beached at Troy. She was on a voyage from Ancona, Papal States to Constantinople, Ottoman Empire. She was refloated on 25 July and taken in to Tenedos, Ottoman Empire for repairs.
Florinda	United States	The schooner departed from New Orleans, Louisiana for San Francisco, California Territory. No further trace, presumed foundered with the loss of all hands.
Industry	(United Kingdom of Great Britain and Ireland) Barbados	The sloop sank at Barbados.
Prudence	United Kingdom	The barque ran aground in the Strait of Malacca. Her crew were rescued. She was on a voyage from Penang, Malaya to China. She had become a wreck by 3 August.

== 7 July ==
List of shipwrecks: 7 July 1849
Ship	State	Description
Enterprise	United Kingdom	The ship ran aground near Key Verde. She was on a voyage from Newport, Monmouthshire to Matanzas, Cuba. She was later refloated and assisted in to Matanzas, arriving on 19 July.
Governor Douglas	United Kingdom	The ship was abandoned in the Atlantic Ocean. Her crew were rescued by Eclipse (United Kingdom). Governor Douglas was on a voyage from Saint John, New Brunswick, British North America to Plymouth, Devon.
Lord Riversdale	United Kingdom	The ship was driven ashore and damaged at Cape Bear, Prince Edward Island, British North America. Her crew were rescued. She was on a voyage from Miramichi, New Brunswick to Liverpool, Lancashire. She was consequently condemned.

== 9 July ==
List of shipwrecks: 9 July 1849
Ship	State	Description
Maria Louisa	(United Kingdom of Great Britain and Ireland) British North America	The ship was wrecked on a shoal west of Blanc Sablon, Province of Canada. Her crew were rescued. She was on a voyage from Bras d'Or, Nova Scotia to Quebec City, Province of Canada.

== 10 July ==
List of shipwrecks: 10 July 1849
Ship	State	Description
Eclipse	United States	The ship departed from Sumatra, Netherlands East Indies for New York. No further trace, presumed foundered with the loss of all hands, possibly in the Indian Ocean during August or September.

== 11 July ==
List of shipwrecks: 11 July 1849
Ship	State	Description
Belfast	United Kingdom	The brig ran aground at the mouth of the Columbia River. She was refloated.
Janet	United Kingdom	The ship was wrecked 45 nautical miles (83 km) west of Alexandria, Egypt. Her crew were rescued. She was on a voyage from Alexandria to Falmouth, Cornwall.
Morning Star	France	The barque ran aground at the mouth of the Columbia River with the loss of a crew member. She was refloated and taken in to Baker's Bay.
Peace	United Kingdom	The ship struck a sunken rock and foundered in the Atlantic Ocean 15 nautical miles (28 km) west of Tory Island, County Donegal. Her crew were rescued. She was on a voyage from Liverpool, Lancashire to Sligo.

== 12 July ==
List of shipwrecks: 12 July 1849
Ship	State	Description
Prince of Wales	United Kingdom	The whaler was wrecked in Melville Bay. At least eleven crew survived.

== 13 July ==
List of shipwrecks: 13 July 1849
Ship	State	Description
Lucie	France	The polacca was wrecked on the Sahara coast of Africa. Her eight crew survived. She was on a voyage from Algiers, Algeria to the Gambia River.

== 15 July ==
List of shipwrecks: 15 July 1849
Ship	State	Description
Belle Isle	United Kingdom	The ship was driven ashore and wrecked in St. Sebastian's Bay, Cape Colony. Her crew were rescued.
Falcon	(United Kingdom of Great Britain and Ireland) British North America	The ship sprang a leak and foundered in the Atlantic Ocean. Her crew survived. She was on a voyage from Jamaica to Halifax, Nova Scotia.
Gipsy	United Kingdom	The sailing barge capsized and sank in Plymouth Sound with the loss of all three crew.
Margaret and Elizabeth	United Kingdom	The brig was abandoned in the Atlantic Ocean 50 nautical miles (93 km) south west of Cape Clear Island, County Cork (51°03′N 9°30′W). Her crew survived. She was on a voyage from London to Bahia, Brazil.

== 16 July ==
List of shipwrecks: 16 July 1849
Ship	State	Description
Filey	United Kingdom	The brig was driven ashore in the Dardanelles. She was refloated on 25 July.
Irvine	United Kingdom	The ship put in to Smyrna, Ottoman Empire with her cargo of coal on fire and was scuttled. She was on a voyage from Troon, Ayrshire to Odesa.
Kate	United Kingdom	The brigantine was driven ashore and wrecked in Mossel Bay. Her crew were rescued.

== 17 July ==
List of shipwrecks: 17 July 1849
Ship	State	Description
Ann	United Kingdom	The ship was lost in St. Bride's Bay. Her crew were rescued.
Harriet and Ann	United Kingdom	The ship was wrecked off Milford Haven, Pembrokeshire.
Mary	United Kingdom	The ship foundered in the English Channel off Alderney, Channel Islands. She was on a voyage from Saint Sampson, Guernsey, Channel Islands to London.

== 18 July ==
List of shipwrecks: 18 July 1849
Ship	State	Description
Madonna d'Idra	Greece	The brig was in collision with a British schooner and sank off Cyprus with the loss of a crew member.

== 19 July ==
List of shipwrecks: 19 July 1849
Ship	State	Description
Richard Dart	United Kingdom	The brig was wrecked in the Prince Edward Islands with the loss of 47 of the 57 people on board. She was on a voyage from London to Auckland, New Zealand.
Sarah	United Kingdom	The ship was in collision with a French vessel and was consequently beached between "Saint Freux" and Équihen, Pas-de-Calais, France. Her crew were rescued. She was on a voyage from Caernarvon to Boulogne, Pas-de-Calais.

== 20 July ==
List of shipwrecks: 20 July 1849
Ship	State	Description
Thankful	United Kingdom	The ship ran aground on the Felsand, in the Baltic Sea. She was on a voyage from Sunderland, County Durham to Kronstadt, Russia. She was refloated and resumed her voyage.
William Hyde	(United Kingdom of Great Britain and Ireland) New South Wales	The ship ran aground and was damaged at Port Phillip, South Australia. She was on a voyage from Port Phillip to Hokianga, New Zealand. She was refloated and put in to Sydney.

== 21 July ==
List of shipwrecks: 21 July 1849
Ship	State	Description
Charles H. Appleton	United States	The ship was wrecked on Green Island, in the Tusket Islands, Nova Scotia, British North America. She was on a voyage from Boston, Massachusetts to Pictou, Nova Scotia.
Harriet	United Kingdom	The ship ran aground on the White Point Ledge, off Guysborough, Nova Scotia, British North America. She was on a voyage from New York City, United States to Quebec City, Province of Canada, British North America.
Hope	United Kingdom	The ship sprang a leak and was beached on the Point of Ayre, Isle of Man. She was on a voyage from Ardrossan, Ayrshire to Runcorn, Cheshire, She was refloated on 31 July and taken in to Ramsey, Isle of Man.
Lenex	United Kingdom	The ship was driven ashore at North Shields, County Durham. She was on a voyage from North Shields to Boston, Massachusetts, United States. She was refloated the next day and resumed her voyage.
McDonnell	United Kingdom	The barque ran aground off Caraquet, New Brunswick, British North America. She was on a voyage from Dalhousie, New Brunswick to Aberdeen.
Mocellas	United States	The schooner was wrecked on the Alacranes Reef. She was on a voyage from Key West, Florida to Tampico, Mexico.

== 22 July ==
List of shipwrecks: 22 July August 1849
Ship	State	Description
Brothers	United Kingdom	The ship was wrecked on Cape Sable Island, Nova Scotia, British North America. Her crew were rescued. She was on a voyage from Cumberland, Nova Scotia to Runcorn, Cheshire.
Clarinda	(United Kingdom of Great Britain and Ireland) British North America	The ship was driven ashore and wrecked north of Chittacamp, Cape Breton Island, Nova Scotia. She was on a voyage from Miramichi, New Brunswick to Dublin.
Kestrel	United Kingdom	The steamship was driven ashore and wrecked at St. Shott's, Newfoundland, British North America. All on board were rescued. She was on a voyage from Halifax, Nova Scotia to Saint John's, Newfoundland.
Minerva	United Kingdom	The ship was wrecked on the Cani Rocks, in the Mediterranean Sea. Her crew were rescued by David (United Kingdom). Minerva was on a voyage from Barcelona, Spain to Constantinople, Ottoman Empire.
Oscar	United Kingdom	The ship sprang a leak and was abandoned 30 nautical miles (56 km) south east of Málaga, Spain. Her fourteen crew were rescued by Priscilla (France). Oscar was on a voyage from Cartagena, Spain to London.

== 23 July ==
List of shipwrecks: 23 July 1849
Ship	State	Description
Hendon	United Kingdom	The ship ran aground on a wreck off Kronstadt, Russia. She was on a voyage from Kronstadt to Exmouth, Devon. She was refloated.
Minerva	United Kingdom	The ship ran aground on the Tryon Reef, off Prince Edward Island, British North America. She was on a voyage from Richibucto, New Brunswick, British North America to Liverpool, Lancashire. She was consequently condemned.

== 24 July ==
List of shipwrecks: 24 July 1849
Ship	State	Description
Athol	United Kingdom	The ship was wrecked on Mistaken Point, Newfoundland, British North America. Her crew were rescued She was on a voyage from Miramichi, New Brunswick, British North America to the Clyde.
Margarite	United Kingdom	The ship was driven ashore at Crosby, Lancashire and broke her back. She was on a voyage from New York, United States to Liverpool, Lancashire. She was refloated on 4 August and taken in to Liverpool.
Orkney	United Kingdom	The ship was driven ashore on "Cape Pogo", Nova Scotia, British North America. She was on a voyage from Pictou, Nova Scotia to New York, United States. She was refloated and resumed her voyage.
Zuleika	United Kingdom	The ship was driven ashore at Cape San Antonio, Argentina. She was on a voyage from Buenos Aires to Patagonia.

== 25 July ==
List of shipwrecks: 25 July 1849
Ship	State	Description
Coligny	United Kingdom	The ship was wrecked near Cardenas, Cuba. She was on a voyage from Havana, Cuba to Cowes, Isle of Wight.
Noble	United States	The ship was wrecked off Blanch Point, Nova Scotia, British North America. Her crew were rescued. She was on a voyage from Boston, Massachusetts to Pictou, Nova Scotia.

== 26 July ==
List of shipwrecks: 26 July 1849
Ship	State	Description
Superb	United Kingdom	The barque was driven ashore on Flamenco Island, Republic of New Granada. She was later refloated.

== 27 July ==
List of shipwrecks: 27 July 1849
Ship	State	Description
Fanny	United Kingdom	The brig ran aground off Aux Cayes, Haiti. She was on a voyage from Saint Thomas, Virgin Islands to "Aguin". She was refloated the next day and resumed her voyage.
Glynne	United Kingdom	The schooner ran aground in the River Dee.
Sea Nymph	United Kingdom	The ship ran aground at Arkhangelsk, Russia. she was on a voyage from Arkhangelsk to Sunderland, County Durham.

== 28 July ==
List of shipwrecks: 28 July 1849
Ship	State	Description
Ann	United Kingdom	The schooner ran aground off Höganäs, Sweden. She was on a voyage from Liverpool, Lancashire to Memel, Prussia.
Hope	United Kingdom	The ship sprang a leak and was beached at the Point of Ayre, Isle of Man. She was on a voyage from Ardrossan, Ayrshire to Runcorn, Cheshire. She was refloated on 31 July and taken in to Ramsey, Isle of Man.

== 29 July ==
List of shipwrecks: 29 July 1849
Ship	State	Description
Acorn	United Kingdom	The ship ran aground on the Whiting Sand, in the North Sea off the coast of Suffolk. She was on a voyage from Louth, Lincolnshire to London. She was refloated and beached at Orford, Suffolk.
Elizabeth	United Kingdom	The brig ran aground on Scroby Sands, Norfolk. She was refloated.
Elizabeth	United Kingdom	The ship ran aground off Brier Island, Nova Scotia, British North America. She was on a voyage from Quebec City, Province of Canada, British North America to an English port.
James of Nairn	United Kingdom	The schooner was damaged by fire at Nairn due to her cargo of quicklime getting wet.
Theodore	United Kingdom	The schooner ran aground on the Barber Sand, in the North Sea off the coast of Norfolk. She was on a voyage from Seaham, County Durham to Ryde, Isle of Wight. She was refloated and resumed her voyage.

== 30 July ==
List of shipwrecks: 30 July 1849
Ship	State	Description
Belhaven	United Kingdom	The ship ran aground on a reef off the Riau Archipelago, Netherlands East Indies. She was on a voyage from London to Singapore. She was refloated and was beached on arrival at Singapore, being severely leaky.
Ceres	United Kingdom	The ship ran aground at Speymouth, Moray.

== 31 July ==
List of shipwrecks: 31 July 1849
Ship	State	Description
Grace	United Kingdom	The ship ran aground on the Holm Sand, in the North Sea off the coast of Suffolk. She was refloated and taken in to Lowestoft.
ivy	(United Kingdom of Great Britain and Ireland) British North America	The ship was wrecked on Grand Bahama, Bahamas. Her crew survived. She was on a voyage from Jamaica to Halifax, Nova Scotia.

== Unknown date ==
List of shipwrecks: Unknown date 1849
Ship	State	Description
Ann	United Kingdom	The smack foundered in Jack Sound, off Milford Haven, Pembrokeshire. Her crew were rescued.
Earl Stanhope	United Kingdom	The ship was wrecked near Brindisi, Kingdom of the Two Sicilies before 1 August. She was on a voyage from Trieste to Deptford, Kent.
Ellen	United Kingdom	The ship ran aground whilst on a voyage from Matanzas, Cuba to Marseille, Bouches-du-Rhône, France. She was refloated and taken in to Key West, Florida, United States for repairs.
Emily	(United Kingdom of Great Britain and Ireland) New Zealand	The schooner was wrecked in Palliser Bay in late July. She was on a voyage from Wellington to Otago.
Helena	Denmark	The full-rigged ship was wrecked in the Bay of Bodega. She was on a voyage from Valparaíso, Chile to San Francisco, Alta California.
Heros	France	The brig was lost before 4 July. She was on a voyage from Marseille, Bouches-du-Rhône to a Channel port.
John Campbell	United Kingdom	The ship was driven ashore on Long Island between 10 and 22 July. She was on a voyage from Moulmein, Burma to an English port. She was refloated and put back to Moulmein.
John Kerr	United Kingdom	The ship ran aground on Robbin's Reef. She was on a voyage from Glasgow, Renfrewshire to New York, United States. She was refloated and resumed her voyage, arriving on 26 July.
Patriot	(United Kingdom of Great Britain and Ireland) New Zealand	The brig was wrecked Waikokopu in early July.
Sarah Louisa	(United Kingdom of Great Britain and Ireland) New South Wales	The ship was wrecked at Port Fairy before 19 July.
Seabird	United Kingdom	The schooner was driven ashore in Blacksod Bay between 16 and 23 July.
Stephanie et Gabriel	France	The ship was wrecked on East Planna Key. Her crew were rescued. She was on a voyage from Port-au-Prince, Haiti to Marseille.
Triumph	(United Kingdom of Great Britain and Ireland) New Zealand	The schooner was wrecked in the Wairau River.
Utica	United States	The ship ran aground on the Merr Ledges, off Machias, Maine. She was on a voyage from Boston, Massachusetts to a port in Nova Scotia. She was refloated and towed in to Cross Island, Maine.
