= French ship Seine =

Fifteen ships of the French Navy have borne the name Seine in honour of the Seine river:

== Ships named Seine ==
- French fluyt Seine (1670), or Seyne, a 6-gun ship captured from the Dutch.
- French fluyt Seine (1671), a 4-gun fluyt
- French fluyt Seine (1698), a 44-gun fluyt, captured by the British on 26 July 1704 and commissioned in the Royal Navy as HMS Falkland Prize
- French fluyt Seine (1720), a Loire-class fluyt
- French fluyt Seine (1768) (1768), a Chameau-class fluyt
- French fluyt Seine (1783), a Seine-class fluyt
- French frigate Seine, a 40-gun frigate, lead ship of her class. Captured by three British frigates during the action of 30 June 1798 and recommissioned in the Royal Navy as HMS Seine.
- French gunboat Seine (1798), a gunboat commissioned on the Nile
- Escaut (1800), a fluyt. She was renamed to Seine at the Bourbon Restoration, and bore the name Escaut again during the Hundred Days before being renamed back to Seine.
- French flute Seine (1806), a 20-gun Loire-class flûte that her crew scuttled to avoid her capture in 1809 by the British Royal Navy
- French fluyt Seine (1845), a 26-gun flute
- French transport Seine (1857), a Dordogne-class transport
- Foudre (1891), originally a torpedo-boat-tending cruiser and later to become the first seaplane tender in history, was started as Seine before being renamed.
- French transport Seine (1913), a littoral transport ship
- French oiler Seine (1962), a replenishment oiler
Ships of the French Navy named Seine
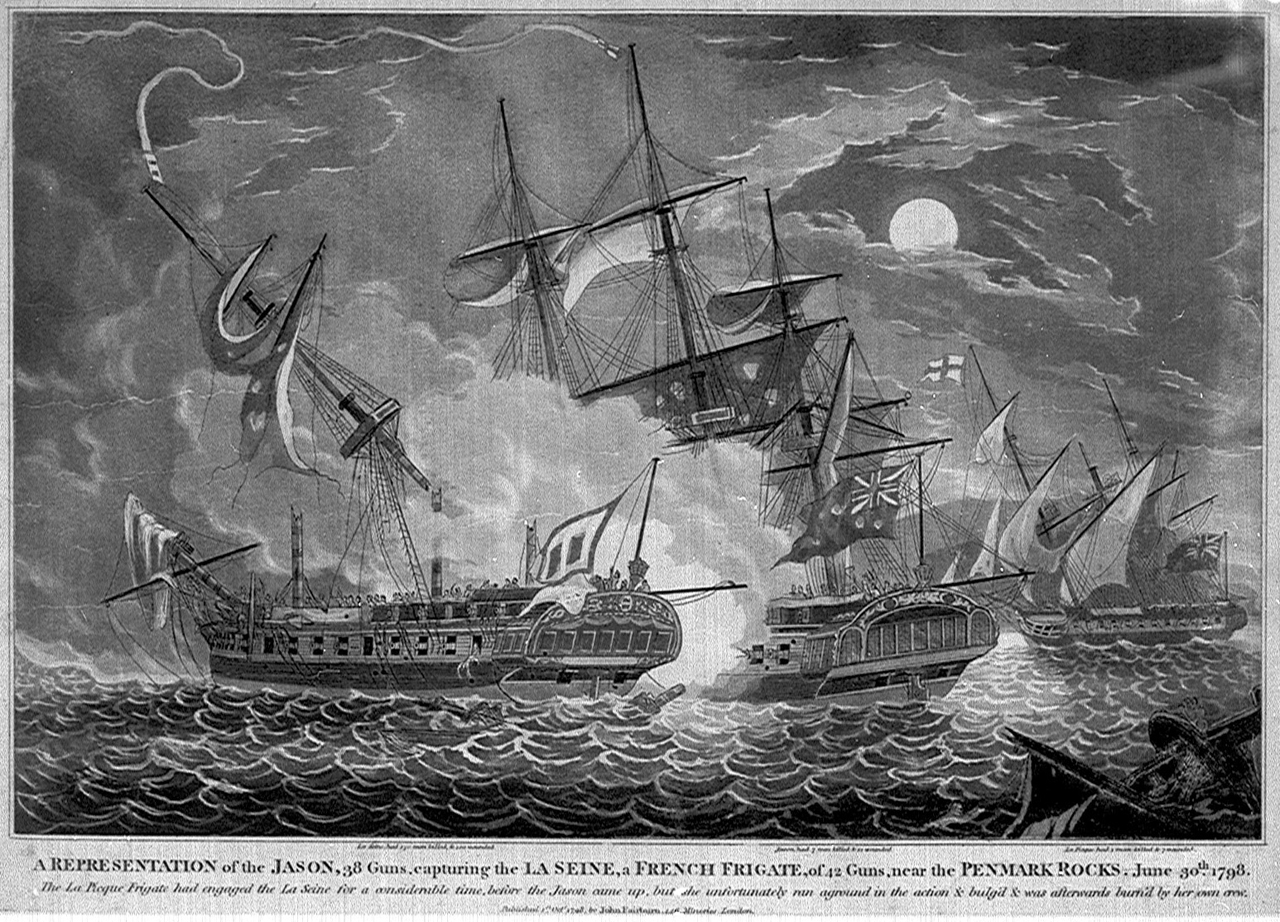
The Action of 30 June 1798 where HMS Jason captured Seine

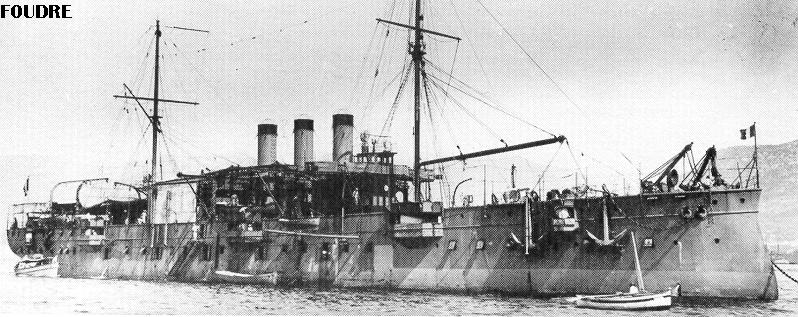
Foudre, ex-Seine, circa 1914

== Ships with related names ==
- French ship Seine II (1917), an auxiliary ship, formerly the German Lynton
- French ship Seine III (1917), an auxiliary ship

== See also ==
- HMS Seine

== Notes and references ==
=== Bibliography ===
- Roche, Jean-Michel (2005). Dictionnaire des bâtiments de la flotte de guerre française de Colbert à nos jours. Vol. 1. Group Retozel-Maury Millau. pp. 409–410. ISBN 978-2-9525917-0-6. OCLC 165892922.
- Roche, Jean-Michel (2005). Dictionnaire des bâtiments de la flotte de guerre française de Colbert à nos jours. Vol. 2. Group Retozel-Maury Millau. p. 250. ISBN 978-2-9525917-0-6. OCLC 165892922.
- Winfield, Rif & Stephen S Roberts (2015) French Warships in the Age of Sail 1786 - 1861: Design Construction, Careers and Fates. (Seaforth Publishing). ISBN 9781848322042
