= HMS Seine =

Three ships of the Royal Navy have been named HMS Seine after the River Seine which runs through Paris and Normandy in France. All three ships named Seine were frigates captured from the French Navy during the French Revolutionary and Napoleonic Wars:

1. HMS Seine (1798) was a fifth-rate frigate, originally named Seine, captured from the French in 1798 and wrecked in 1803.
2. HMS Seine was a fifth-rate frigate, originally named Embuscade, captured from the French in 1798, named HMS Ambuscade and added to the Royal Navy, renamed HMS Seine in 1803, and broken up in 1813.
3. Seine was a fifth-rate frigate, originally named Cérès, captured from the French in 1814, named Seine, but never commissioned, and broken up at Deptford in May 1823.

== See also ==
- French ship Seine
