= Prince of Orange (1814 ship) =

British merchantman and whaler 1814–1856

History

United Kingdom
- Name: Prince of Orange
- Builder: Thomas Burn, Sunderland
- Launched: 19 February 1814
- Fate: Foundered 9 April 1858

General characteristics
- Tons burthen: 1814: 359, or 3593/94, or 363 (bm); 1846: Old Act: 486 (bm); New Act (post 1836): 526, or 566 (bm)
- Length: 1814: 99 ft 9 in (30.4 m); 1846: 122 ft 8 in (37.4 m)
- Beam: 1814: 29 ft 7 in (9.0 m); 1846: 30 ft 0 in (9.1 m)
- Armament: 8 guns

Prince of Orange was launched in Sunderland in 1814. She originally sailed as a West Indiaman but then became an East Indiaman, sailing to India under a license from the British East India Company (EIC). She made two voyages transporting convicts to Australia, the first in 1820–1821 to New South Wales, and the second in 1822 to Van Diemen's Land. Between 1830 and 1840 she made nine voyages as a whaler to Davis Strait. She was lengthened and rebuilt in 1846. In December 1852 she grounded. It took some months to get her off. She then need major repairs. She also suffered damages in 1854. She foundered in 1858.

== Career ==
Prince of Orange first appeared in online copies of Lloyd's Register (LR) in 1815. On 29 September she put into Plymouth in distress.

Year	Master	Owner	Trade	Source
1815	Hutchinson; T.Silk	Johnson	London–St Kitts	LR
1816	T.Silk	Johnson	Plymouth–London; London–Île de France	
1818	T.Silk	[C.] Johnson	London–Calcutta	LR

In 1813 the EIC had lost its monopoly on the trade between India and Britain. British ships were then free to sail to India or the Indian Ocean under a license from the EIC. Prince of Orange's owners applied for such a licence on 6 December 1815; they received the licence on 8 December.

Captain Silk sailed from London on 5 April 1817, under a license from the EIC, bound for Bombay.

On 25 January 1819, Prince of Orange, Silk, master, was ashore near Ramsgate. She had been on her way to Ceylon when she ran afoul of Renewal, Cromartie, master, which was on her way to Barbados. She was gotten off but was expected to have to put into the Thames for repairs.

Year	Master	Owner	Trade	Source & notes
1819	T.Silk	Johnson	London–Calcutta	LR; damages repaired 1818
1821	T.Silk	Johnson	London	LR; damages repaired 1818

Convict voyage to Port Jackson (1820–1821): Captain Thomas Silk sailed from the Downs on 8 October 1820. She arrived at Port Jackson on 12 February 1821. She had embarked 136 convicts and suffered one convict death on the voyage.

Convict voyage to Hobart (1822): Captain John Moncrief sailed from England on 1 April 1822. She arrived at Hobart on 23 July 1822. She had embarked 136 convicts and suffered four convict death on the voyage.

Year	Master	Owner	Trade	Source & notes
1822	T.Silk; Moncrief	Johnson	London; London–New South Wales	LR; damages repaired 1818
1824	T.Moncrief; J.White	Johnson	London–New South Wales	LR; damages repaired 1818
1825	R.Nelson	Soames	Cork transport	LR; small repairs 1824
1826	J.Jameson	Hutton	Leith–"Mrmc"	LR; small repairs 1824
1827	J.Jameson	Hutton	Greenock–Charleston	LR; small repairs 1823
1828	J.Jameson	Beveridge	Greenock–Petersburg	LR; small repairs 1823 & 1824
1828	J.Jameson	P.Jaffrey	Leith	LR (Supple.); small repairs 1823 & 1824, & good repair 1828
1830	J.Jameson	W.Guthrie	Leith	LR (Supple.); good repair 1828
1831	Gutherie	Waddell	Leith–Davis Strait	LR; good repair 1828

=== Northern Fisheries whaler (1830–1840) ===
From 1830 to 1836, and 1839 to 1840 Prince of Orange was a whaler, hunting whales in the northern whale fishery, that is, the waters of Davis Strait and Greenland. The data below came primarily from Coltish:

Year	Master	Where	Whales	Tuns whale oil
1830	Guthrie	Davis Strait	1	
1831	Guthrie	Davis Strait	4	25
1832	Guthrie	Davis Strait	30	115
1833	Guthrie	Davis Strait	29	128
1834	Guthrie	Davis Strait	14	67.5
1835	Guthrie	Davis Strait	2	15
1836	Guthrie	Davis Strait	1	5

After two years of poor whaling seasons Prince of Orange returned to trading.

Year	Master	Owner	Trade	Homeport	Source & notes
1838	J.Watts	Woods	Leith–North America	Leith	LR; large repair 1830, & small repairs 1838
1839	Packwood	Woods	Leith–Davis Strait	Leith	LR; large repair 1830, & small repairs 1838

Prince of Orange returned to whaling.

Year	Master	Where	Whales	Tuns whale oil
1839	Packwood	Davis Strait	1	7.5
1840	Stratton (or Straiton)	Davis Strait	2	7.5

After two more years of poor whaling, Prince of Orange returned to trading.

Year	Master	Owner	Trade	Source
1840	Packwood; R.Deas	Woods	Leith–Davis Strait; Leith–New South Wales	LR; large repair 1830, small repairs 1838, & large repair 1841
1843	R.Deas	Woods	Leith–New South Wales; Liverpool–Africa	LR; large repair 1830 & 1841
1844	R.Deas; Ellis	Woods	Liverpool–Africa; Liverpool	LR; large repair 1830 & 1841
1845	Ellis	Woods	Liverpool–Dundee	LR; large repair 1839 & 1841; "wants repair"

On 21 February 1845, Prince of Orange sailed from Ichaboe Island. She was one of dozens of vessels that called in at the island after 1843, traffic peaking in 1845, to pick up guano. She arrived at New Orleans on 10 April, and returned to Britain with a cargo of cotton.

=== Rebuilt 1846 ===
Year	Master	Owner	Trade	Source & notes
1846	Ellis; A.Smith	Woods	Leith–Onega, Russia; Liverpool "Rest."	LR; lengthened and almost rebuilt 1846

On 16 January 1847 Captain Smith sailed Prince of Orange for Bombay. She arrived there on 15 May. She left Bombay on 10 July and returned to Liverpool.

Year	Master	Owner	Trade	Homeport	Source
1850	Stephens	Woods	Liverpool–Bombay	Leith	LR; lengthened and almost rebuilt 1846

On 22 October Richard Cobden, Archibald, master, caught fire about 100 miles from Reunion while sailing from Calcutta to London. Prince of Orange, Stephens, master, rescued the crew and took them into Saint Helena.

On 4 November 1853 Prince of Orange fell on her side while in the Brunswick Graving Dock at Liverpool. She was righted but with the loss of her mizzen mast and with her fore and main masts sprung.

Year	Master	Owner	Trade	Homeport	Source
1854		Woods	Liverpool–Savannah	Leith	LR; Lengthened & rebuilt 1846, large repair 1853
1856	George	Harrison	Liverpool–Crimea	Liverpool	LR; Lengthened & rebuilt 1846, large repair 1853, and small repairs 1855
1858	Williams	Harrison	Liverpool–India	Liverpool	LR; Lengthened & rebuilt 1846, large repair 1855, and small repairs 1855 & 1857

== Fate ==
In 1858, Prince of Orange, was sailing from Kooria Mooria (Khuriya Muriya Islands) to Falmouth when her crew had to abandon her at sea. She foundered on 9 April near Mauritius.

Between 1855 and 1860, some 200,000 tons of guano were mined from the islands. The mining ceased soon after.
