= USS King Philip =

History

United States
- Name: USS King Philip
- Launched: 1845
- Acquired: 21 April 1861
- In service: circa 28 April 1861
- Renamed: Originally USS Powhatan; renamed USS King Philip 4 November 1861
- Fate: Sold 15 September 1865

General characteristics
- Type: Steamer / Dispatch boat
- Displacement: 500 long tons (510 t)
- Length: 204 ft (62 m)
- Beam: 22 ft 11 in (6.99 m)
- Depth of hold: 8 ft (2.4 m)
- Propulsion: steam engine; side wheel-propelled
- Complement: 14
- Armament: 1 × gun

USS King Philip was a steamer that was originally named Powhatan; she was acquired by the United States Navy during the American Civil War. She was used by the Union Navy as a dispatch boat, providing various services.

== Service history ==
Powhatan—a side-wheel steamer built in Baltimore, Maryland in 1845 by John A. and E. T. Robb—operated on the Potomac River out of Georgetown, D.C. Early in the Civil War, the Union Army seized the side wheeler on 21 April 1861 and transferred her to the United States Navy. The next day, she entered the Washington Navy Yard to be fitted out for war service. A week later, Lieutenant John Glendy Sproston was ordered to take command of Powhatan and proceed to Kettle Bottom Shoals to replace and protect buoys there which had been removed by Confederate agents. After patrol duty in the Potomac River, helping to protect Washington, D.C., during the early months of the Civil War, Powhatan steamed to Baltimore for repairs. She was renamed USS King Philip on 4 November.

Throughout the Civil War, King Philip was used as a dispatch boat, shuttling mail, supplies, and passengers between Washington, D.C., and Union ships on the Potomac and Rappahannock Rivers. In 1862 she served as a temporary home for the crew of the famous USS Monitor while they were waiting for their ship to be repaired and refitted. King Philip was sold at auction to H. F. Harrill on 15 September 1865.

== Sources ==
- Quarstein, John V. Quarstein (2010). The Monitor Boys: The Crew of the Union's First Ironclad.
  The History Press. p. 349. ISBN 9781596294554.
