= Oregon (1845 steamboat) =

Side-wheel driven steamboat operating on the Hudson River

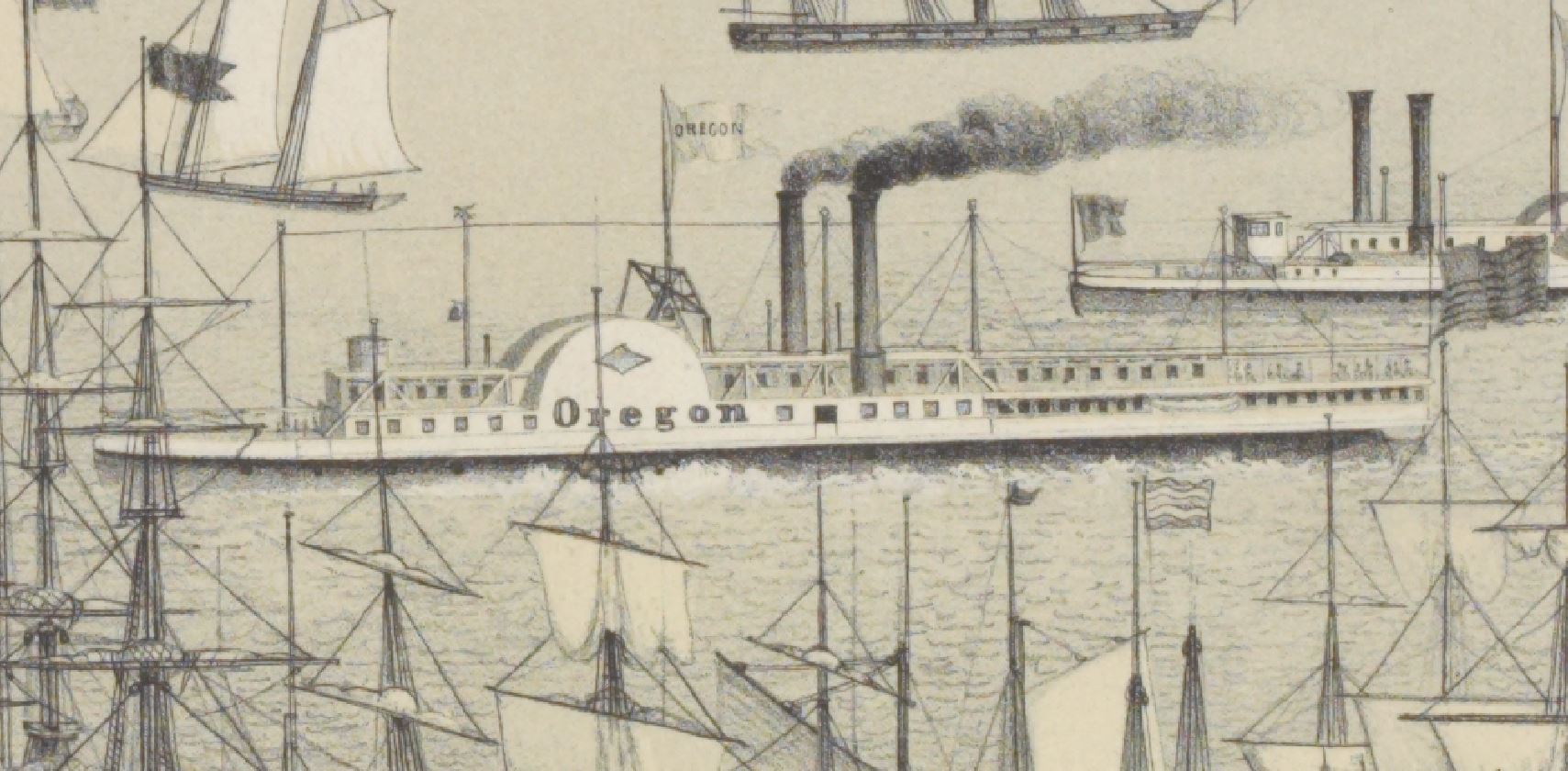
- Oregon

History
- Name: Oregon
- Owner: George Law, Daniel Drew.
- Route: Upper Hudson River
- In service: 1845

General characteristics
- Type: inland steamship
- Installed power: steam engine
- Propulsion: side-wheels

Oregon built in 1845, was a side-wheel driven steamboat operating on the Hudson River. Originally built for George Law, it was later bought by Daniel Drew. Drew was operating a service using his boat Knickerbocker on the Stonington and New York route. George Law saw the chance to provide competition and had the Oregon (a "floating palace") built in 1845.

== History ==
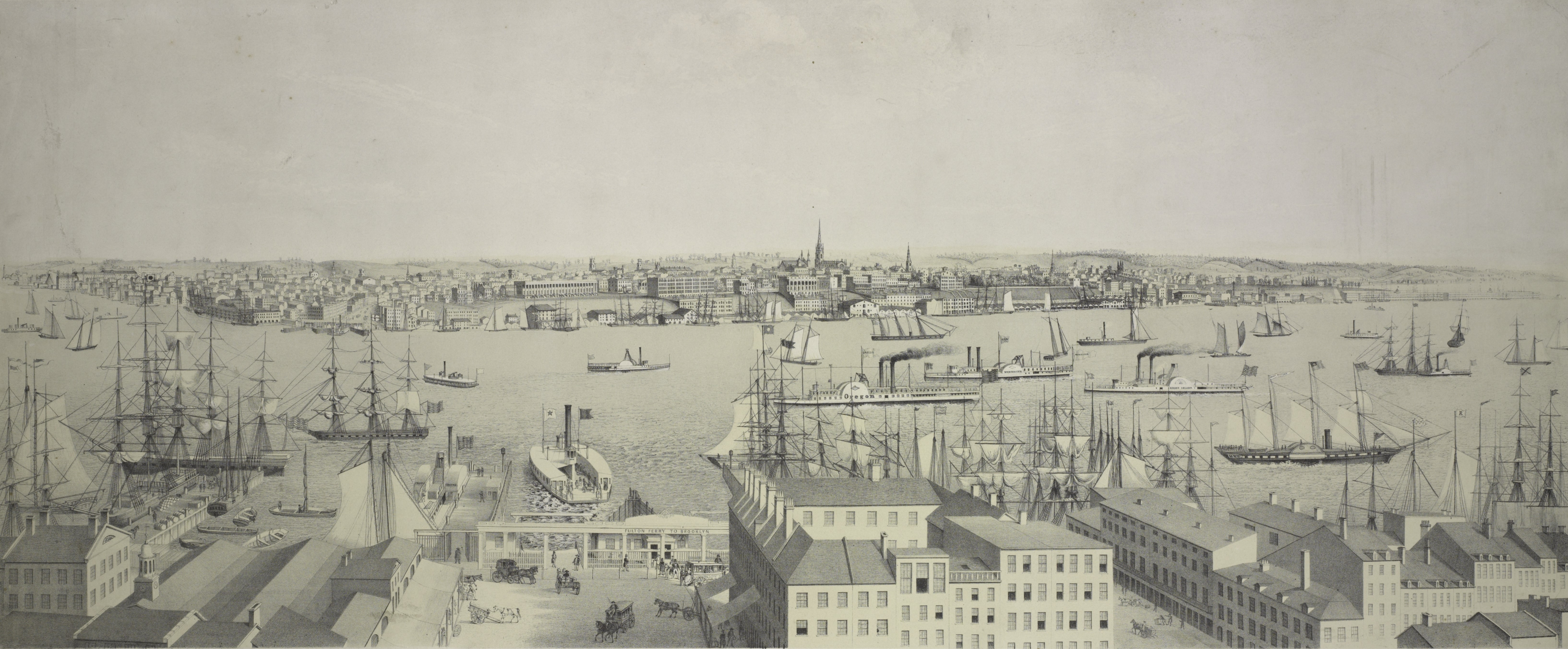
The Oregon facing Brooklyn as seen from the U.S. Hotel in Lower Manhattan.

This was then the fastest steamboat in the country. She was installed on the Stonington run with tickets sold at competitive prices. Consequently Drew was to lose trade. Cornelius Vanderbilt a business partner and friend of Drew made a challenge to race her against his own ship Traveler, which was serving the New Haven to New York route. Traveler was half the size of the Oregon. The boats raced in 1845 a twenty mile course with no clear winner.

== River race ==
A frustrated Vanderbilt was to commission a new contender the C. Vanderbilt. The Vanderbilt weighed 1000 tons and could reach 25 miles per hour. Vanderbilt made a wager of $1000. A race was agreed for 1 June 1847; the route was agreed as a round trip on the Hudson River from the Battery to Ossining and back. 70 miles in total. Both departed the Battery at 11 AM going north with the tide against them, for 30 miles they were neck and neck.

However as the vessels turned a stake boat at Ossining the Oregon pulled half a length ahead. Cornelius Vanderbilt, who had taken the wheel, took the turn too quickly and over shot resulting in a small collision, which severely damaged the Oregons wheelhouse. With fifteen miles to go, the tide in running south in favour of both, the Oregon ran out of coal and the crew started to feed the boilers with any wood to hand, burning furniture and the like. The Oregon was to win 1200 feet ahead of its rival. Both vessels had done the course in three hours and fifteen minutes.

== Later use ==
One year later in 1848 Drew bought the “Oregon” from Law, for use on the Hudson River, taking her off the Stonington run.
