= Richard Cobden (1845 ship) =

History

United Kingdom
- Name: Richard Cobden
- Namesake: Richard Cobden
- Builder: Alexander Stephen & Sons, Dundee
- Launched: 1845
- Fate: Burnt at sea on 22 October 1850

General characteristics
- Tons burthen: Old Act: 361(bm); New Act (post 1836): 380 (bm)
- Sail plan: Barque

Richard Cobden was launched in 1845 in Dundee. She first appeared in Lloyd's Register (LR) in 1845.

Year	Master	Owner	Trade	Source
1845	Archibald	W[illiam] Small, Dundee	Dundee–Petersburg; Dundee-Jamaica	LR
1850	Archibald	Martin & Co.	Dundee–Ceylon	LR

On 22 October 1850 Richard Cobden, Archibald, master, caught fire some 100 miles from Réunion while sailing from Calcutta to London. Prince of Orange, Stephens, master, rescued the crew and took them into Saint Helena.

Richard Cobden, having sailed from Calcutta on 9 September 1850 with a cargo of sugar, cotton, safflower, jute etc. On 22 October, when Richard Cobden was some 50 miles from the island of Bourbon, her cargo of safflower oil underwent spontaneous combustion. She burnt to her waterline and then sank stern foremost. Prince of Orange, of Leith, rescued the crew and took them to Saint Helena. Richard Cobden and her cargo were insured.
