= SS Florinda =

SS Florinda was a 57-foot (17 m) double-masted schooner constructed on the Tangipahoa River to the north of New Orleans in 1845 and engaged in the lake trade on the Northern Gulf Coast. Under the command of owner Harmon Jones and Captain James Kenmure, she sailed on July 6, 1849, from New Orleans for the California Gold Rush and was feared lost at sea with all hands while sailing around Cape Horn. Twenty-six years later, reports of the crew living as castaways on an uncharted island in the Straits of Magellan mysteriously surfaced.

== History ==
SS Florinda was a wooden commercial schooner engaged in delivering passengers, lumber and other goods from New Orleans, Louisiana to ports throughout the Northern Gulf Coast. Frederick Arnet was the original owner and master of the schooner until he sold the vessel to Harmon Jones on July 2, 1849 for his 14,000-nautical-mile (26,000 km; 16,000 mi) voyage from New Orleans around Cape Horn and then to San Francisco, California.

== Disappearance ==
Florinda sailed from New Orleans on July 6, 1849, with fourteen crew members to the Balize (now known as Pilottown) located at the mouth of the Mississippi River and awaited her captain, Harmon Jones. Florinda then made way first along the coastlines of the Gulf of Mexico to Cape Florida on Key Biscayne near what is today Miami, Florida. She then sailed across the Atlantic Ocean to the Cape Verde Islands. On leaving Cape Verde, she then sailed to Brazil and then onwards around Cape Horn.

After a year without further communication with the vessel, Florinda and her crew were feared lost at sea.

In 1875, twenty-six years after her disappearance, reports of the crew of Florinda having survived their shipwreck in a storm and who were now living on an uncharted island in the Straits of Magellan surfaced. For most of the summer of 1875, this story caught the imagination of the world until incorrect reporting from the Louisville Courier-Journal confused Florinda with another vessel and it became widely considered a hoax at the time. Interest in Florinda quickly waned and the crew's survival and existence were never further investigated.
