= French fluyt Seine (1845) =

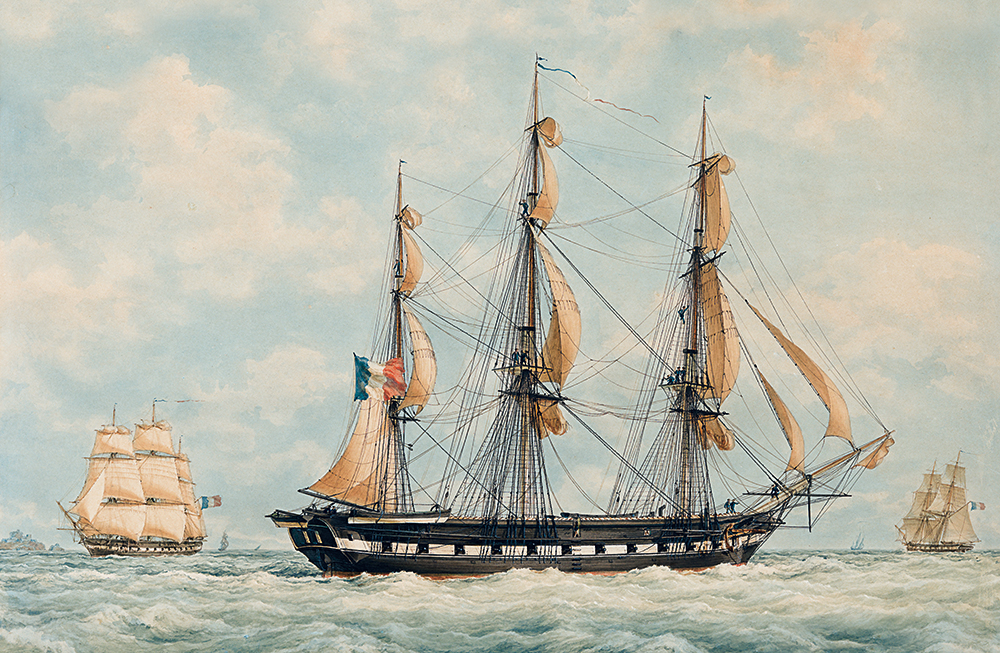
- Portrait of Durance, sister-ship of Seine, by François Roux.

History

France
- Name: Seine
- Namesake: Seine
- Builder: Rochefort
- Laid down: 26 May 1842
- Launched: 22 February 1845
- Commissioned: September 1845
- Fate: Wrecked off Port-de-France (now Nouméa)

General characteristics
- Type: Fluyt
- Tons burthen: 800 tonnes
- Length: Circa 43.40 metres
- Beam: 10.40 metres
- Draught: 4.33 to 5.64 metres
- Propulsion: Sail
- Crew: 154 232 with troops
- Armament: 22 30-pounders (16cm howitzers), 4 8-pounders
- Armour: Timber

French fluyt Seine was a fluyt of the French Navy. Sent to the Pacific in a time of colonial rivalry with the United Kingdom to both consolidate French positions and diplomatically ease tensions with the British, she ran aground off Balade and was wrecked. The remains of the ship have become a subject of interest for maritime archeology, notably yielding a rare example of a desalination device of the 1840s.

== Career ==
Designed as a fluyt, or "corvette of burden", (Note: Corvette de charge in the French parlance of the time (Demerliac, p.165)) Seine was built under the direction of Bernard Chariot upon plans drawn by Forfait and revised by Sané, with notably a hull sheathed in bronze.

Seine left Brest on 3 September 1845, under Lieutenant Commander François Leconte, to take the New Zealand station and relieve Rhin.

Seine ferried troops to Tahiti, where the British encouraged the local population to riot against the French, which had led Abel Aubert du Petit-Thouars to expel British consul George Pritchard to Australia.

She also carried a letter from Minister Mackau to renounce sovereignty over New Caledonia and ease tensions with the British in the Pacific.

== Fate ==
On 4 July 1846, she ran aground off Balade and became a total loss. The crew abandoned ship with no loss of life (Note: Demerliac mentions "including two drunks who had initially remained on the wreck".) and spent two months at Pouébo before the British ship Arabian rescued them. The diplomatic letters reached the British via Bishop Guillaume Douarre.

== Legacy ==
On 28 May 1968, French Navy frogmen of the Dunkerquoise located the wreck of Seine in 23-metre deep waters, near Pouébo. Between 7 and 18 April 1997, Laplace conducted a survey of the wreckage, with the local association Fortunes de Mer Calédonienne.

The wreck triggered interest as carrying the lone surviving example of a Peyre et Rocher desalination system, invented in 1840 by chemist Peyre and industrialist Rocher and used on long-haul ships. The system used waste heat from the kitchen of the ship to desalinate water in a 1.2-ton copper cubic cistern. The device was located 20 metres from the wreck.
