= Oregon (disambiguation) =

Oregon is a U.S. state in the Pacific Northwest.

Oregon may also refer to:

== Places ==
United States

- Oregon, Arkansas
- Oregon, Illinois
- Oregon, Kentucky
- Oregon, Maryland
- Oregon, Missouri
- Oregon, Ohio
- Oregon, Pennsylvania
- Oregon, Tennessee
- Oregon (town), Wisconsin
  - Oregon, Wisconsin (the village it contains)
- Oregon City, California
- Oregon City, Oregon
- Oregon County, Missouri
- Oregon District, a neighborhood in Dayton, Ohio
- Oregon Hill, a neighborhood in Richmond, Virginia
- Oregon Inlet, an inlet in the state of North Carolina
- Oregon Township, Michigan
- Oregon Township, Pennsylvania

=== Historical usage ===
- Oregon (toponym), etymology of the name "Oregon"
- Oregon Country
- Oregon Mission
- Oregon Territory
- Oregon Trail

== Botany ==
- Douglas-fir, a timber commonly known as "oregon" or "oregon pine"
- The Oregon-grape, a plant in the genus Mahonia

== Music ==
- Oregon (band), an American jazz and world music group
- Oregon (album)
- Oregon, a piece of music for concert band, by James Swearingen
- Oregon, a composition by composer Jacob de Haan
- Oregon, a song written by John Linnell

== Ships ==
- Oregon (sidewheeler 1852), a steamboat in Oregon, United States, in the 1850s
- CSS Oregon, a Confederate gunboat
- NOAAS Oregon (R 551), a fisheries research vessel in service with the U.S. Fish and Wildlife Service from 1949 to 1970 and with the U.S. National Oceanic and Atmospheric Administration from 1970 to 1980
- NOAAS Oregon II (R 332), a fisheries research vessel in service with the U.S. Fish and Wildlife Service from 1967 to 1970 and with the U.S. National Oceanic and Atmospheric Administration since 1970
- SS Oregon, the name of a number of ships
- USS Oregon, the name of a number of U.S. Navy ships

== Universities ==
- Oregon State University, a public university in Corvallis, Oregon
- University of Oregon, a public university in Eugene, Oregon

== Other ==
- "Oregon" (Awake), a television episode
- Oregon Ducks, the athletic program of the University of Oregon
- Oregon State Beavers, the athletic program of the Oregon State University
- Oregon Scientific, a manufacturer of electronic products
- The Oricon Charts, often mis-romanized as the "Oregon Charts"
- The Oregon Files, a group of novels written by author Clive Cussler
- Oregon Tool, American tool manufacturer known for their saw chains

== See also ==
- USS Oregonian (ID-1323)
- USS Oregon City (CA-122)
