= SS California (1848) =

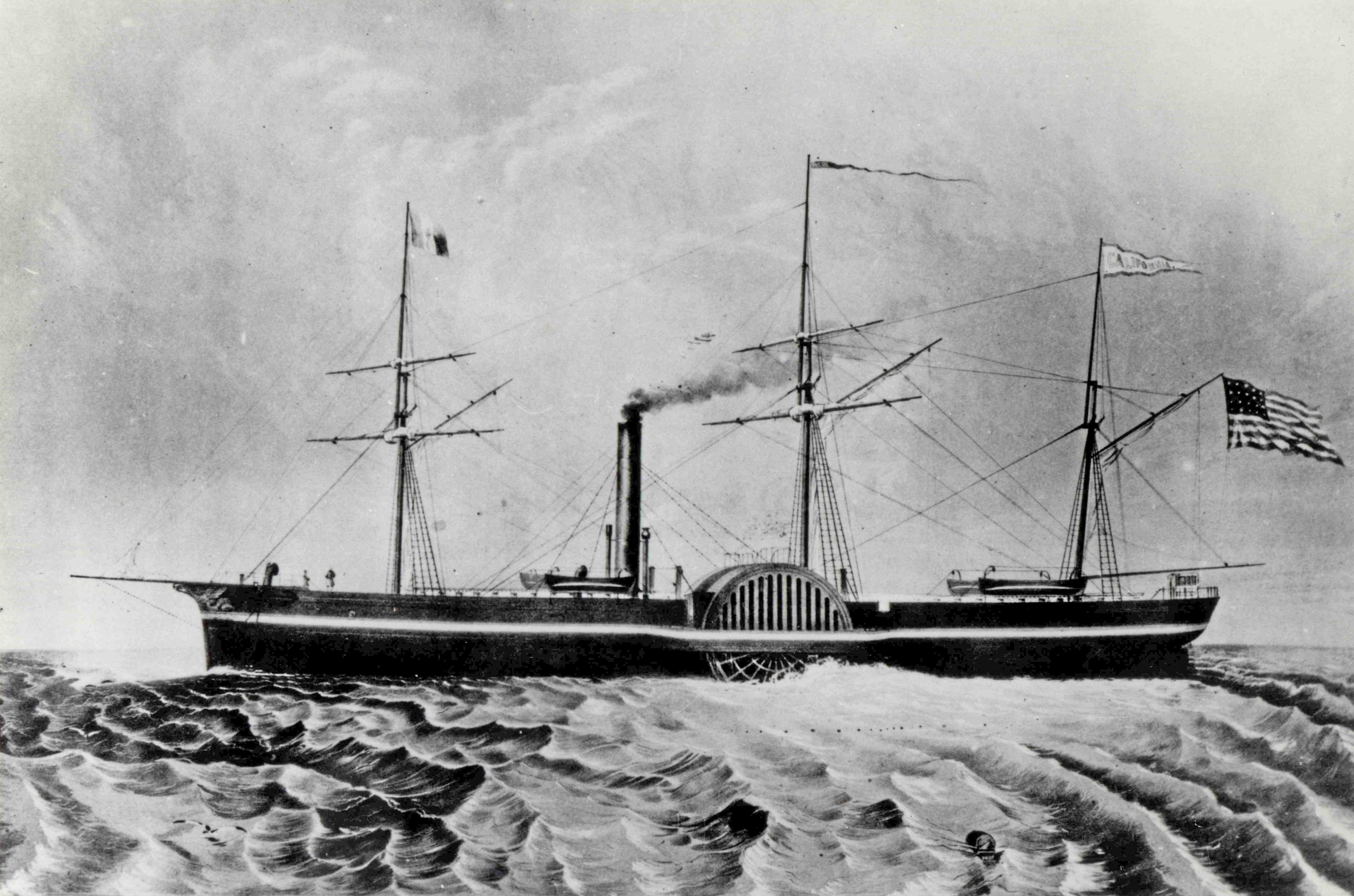
- SS California, Pacific Mail's first ship on the Panama City to San Francisco route.

History

United States
- Name: California
- Laid down: 4 January 1848
- Launched: 19 May 1848
- Fate: Wrecked Pacasmayo Province, Peru 1895

General characteristics
- Length: 203 feet (62 m)
- Beam: 33.5 feet (10.2 m)
- Draft: 14 feet (4.3 m)
- Depth of hold: 20 feet (6.1 m)
- Propulsion: 2 × 26 feet (7.9 m) dia. side paddle wheels

SS California was one of the first steamships to steam in the Pacific Ocean and the first steamship to travel from Central America to North America. She was built for the Pacific Mail Steamship Company, which was founded on April 18, 1848, as a joint stock company in the State of New York by a group of New York City merchants: William H. Aspinwall, Edwin Bartlett, Henry Chauncey, Mr. Alsop, G.G. Howland, and S.S. Howland. She was the first of three steamboats specified in a government mail contract to provide mail, passenger, and freight service from Panama to and from San Francisco and Oregon.

== Background ==
In the first decades of the United States' existence, legislators generally did not believe the federal government had the power or authority to build roads, canals, or other internal improvements, as the U.S. Constitution did not specify this as a legitimate federal role. Internal infrastructure improvements were thought to be the responsibility of private enterprise or the states. One way around this prohibition was to heavily subsidize mail contracts since this duty traditionally belonged to the federal government. Since about 89 percent of the federal government's income then was in the form of excise taxes on imports (also called custom duties or ad valorem taxes of about 25%) there was only a limited amount of money available.

Prior to 1848, Congress had already appropriated money to help subsidize mail steamers between Europe and the United States. A congressional mail contract from East Coast cities and New Orleans, Louisiana, to and from the Chagres River in Panama was won by the U.S. Mail Steamship Company in about 1847. The often wildly variable Chagres was the Atlantic terminus of the trans-Isthmus trail across the Isthmus of Panama. After disembarking from their paddle steamer on the Atlantic side, travelers ascended the Chagres River about 30 miles (48 km) by native canoes or dugouts before switching to mules to complete the roughly 60-mile (97-km) journey. In the rainy season (June–December), the trail often degenerated into a very muddy ordeal.

The U.S. Mail Steamship Company, headed by George Law, dispatched their first paddle steamer, Falcon, from New York City on December 1, 1848, just before the discovery of gold in California was confirmed by President James K. Polk in his State of the Union speech on December 5 and the display of about $3,000 (~$90,196 in 2025) in gold at the War Department. When the Falcon reached New Orleans, the company was swamped with passenger requests. Falcon was joined by the steamships Crescent City, Orus, and Isthmus, as well as three overloaded sailing ships headed for the Isthmus of Panama.

== Contract and construction ==
California was built as the first steamship specified in a mail contract of about $199,000 set up by Congress in 1847 (~$5.82 million in 2025) to establish mail, passenger and freight service to the newly acquired territories of Oregon and California. These subsidies were for three steamships of about 1,000 tons to regularly (roughly every three weeks) steam from Oregon and California to and from Panama City, the Pacific terminus of the trans-Isthmus trail across the Isthmus of Panama. The contract for the ship was given to William H. Webb, a leading shipbuilder of New York City, in 1848.

California was 203 feet (62 m) in length, 33.5 feet (10.2 m) in beam, 20 feet (6.1 m) in depth, drew 14 feet (4.3 m) of water and had a capacity rating of 1,057 gross tons. She had two decks, three masts and a round stern, with a normal capacity of about 210 passengers. On January 4, 1848, California's keel was laid down at New York, and launched on May 19, 1848. She cost $200,082 to build.

California was built of choice oak and cedar, with her hull reinforced with diagonal iron straps to better withstand the pounding of her paddle wheels. Her hull was a modified version of the clipper ship hulls then becoming popular. She was rigged with three masts and sails, and classed as a brigantine sailing ship. The wind was meant to be only an auxiliary or emergency source of power, and she was expected to carry a head of steam at nearly all times while underway.

California was powered by two 26-foot (7.9-m) diameter side paddle wheels driven by a large one-cylinder side-lever engine built by Novelty Iron Works of New York City. The engine's cylinder bore was about 75 inches (190 cm) in diameter with a stroke of 8 feet (2.4 m). The engine turned the two side paddle wheels at about 13 revolutions per minute, driving the ship at about eight knots, with 14 knots possible under good conditions. She carried about 520 tons of coal.

=== Engine ===
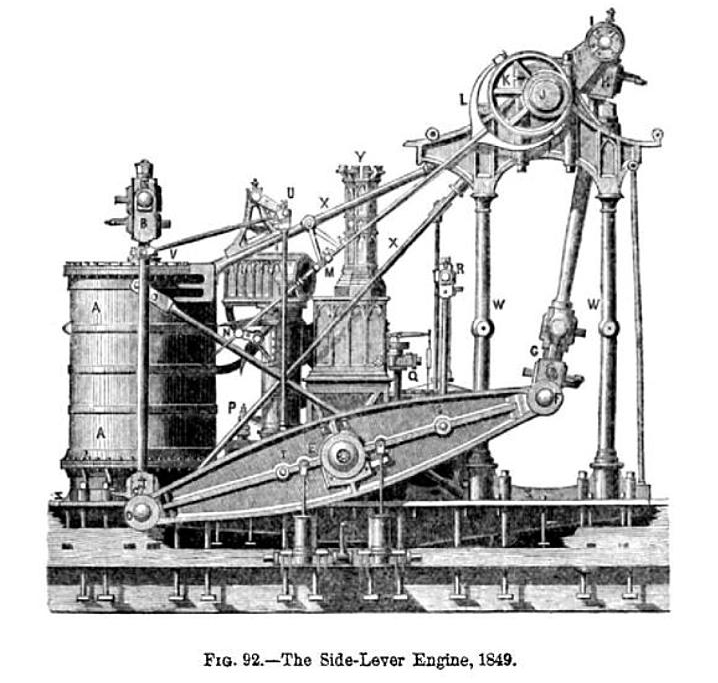
Side-lever engine of SS Pacific (1849). "A" is the single large 75-inch (190-cm) diameter vertical cylinder containing a piston with a stroke of about 8 feet (2.4 m). The single steam-powered piston with a long connecting rod drives the side lever up and down through an exterior connecting rod (called lifts) on the left. The massive forged iron side lever "T" is about 18 feet (5.5 m) long and connects to one end of a connecting rod. On the other end of the connecting rod is the crank shaft, "I". The crank shaft plus connecting rod converts the side lever's up and down motion to rotary motion to power the paddle wheels. The shaft labeled "J" is the part of the crank shaft that connects to the paddle wheels.

A side-lever engine was a rugged and fairly easy-to-build but inefficient single-stage design for early marine steam engines, eventually replaced in ocean use with better and more efficient multiple-stage engines. Like all engines, the side-lever engine required lubrication. Piston-cylinder lubrication was provided by allowing the steam to pick up a small amount of oil before being injected into the cylinder. Some type of oil cups were used on all the other moving parts. The lubricant used then was a form of whale oil, the main lubricant of the period. The maintenance schedule is unknown. She was driven by about 10 psi steam generated by two return-flue boilers that used salt water for steam and coal as her fuel. Since steamships required from 2 to 10 tons of coal per day, they were more expensive to run and had a maximum range of about 3,000 miles (4,800 km) before needing refueling. The coal was fed to California's boilers by twelve firemen shoveling by hand around the clock.

A regular sailing ship typically made 4-5 knots, and a Clipper ship averaged about 6-7 knots. Clipper ships under optimum sailing conditions could make 15-20 knots. A clipper ship named Champion of the Seas traveled a record 465 nautical miles in 24 hours, and the Flying Cloud set the world's sailing record for the fastest passage between New York City and San Francisco around Cape Horn—89 days, 8 hours. She held this record for over 130 years, from 1854 to 1989.

== Maiden voyage ==
California left New York City on October 6, 1848, with only a partial load of about 60 saloon (about $300 fare) and 150 steerage (about $150 fare) passengers. Only a few were going all the way to California. Her crew numbered about 36 men. She left New York well before definite word of the California Gold Rush had reached the East Coast. She made it to Rio de Janeiro in a record time of 24 days. There she stopped for engine repairs and to resupply coal, fresh water, wood, fresh fruits and vegetables, and other supplies. After traversing the Straits of Magellan she stopped at Valparaíso, Chile; Callao, Peru (just outside Lima); and Paita, Peru for more supplies. The coal supplies had been previously shipped to the various ports by sailing ships that had left earlier.

As word of the California Gold Rush spread, she started picking up more passengers wanting to go to California. At Valparaíso she filled most of her remaining berths. When news reached the East Coast about the gold rush and the estimated time of California's arrival at Panama City, there was a rush to get to Panama to catch her before she continued the journey up the Pacific coast. When California arrived at Panama City on January 17, 1849, there were many more passengers than there was room. Provisions were made for extra passengers that were selected by lottery and paid $200 per ticket; some sold their tickets for much more. The SS California eventually proceeded towards San Francisco with about 400 passengers and a crew of 36; many more passengers were left behind to find their way later on other ships.

On the way to San Francisco, low coal supplies required her to put into San Diego and Monterey, California to get wood to feed her boilers—engines then were simple enough to burn either coal or wood. Any "extra" wood on board was also fed to the boilers. The combination of a larger load and the southbound California Current required more coal than she had picked up in Panama. As the first steamship on the Panama-to-San Francisco route, she had no prior experience or fuel consumption information to follow.

== Gold Rush period ==
Almost all of her crew deserted shortly after arriving in San Francisco. It took Captain Cleveland Forbes two months to rehire a new crew and get more coal and steam back to Panama. California left San Francisco on May 1, 1849, with the California mail, passengers, and high-value cargo, as specified in the congressional mail contract, and reached Panama City on May 23, 1849. The new crew was much more expensive, but the Panama City–San Francisco route was so potentially lucrative that the costs were simply deferred to the passengers in the price of a ticket. The mail, passengers, and priority cargo to and from California soon developed into a paying proposition as more and more mail, cargo, and passengers flowed to and from California. Much of the gold found in California was shipped back east by Panama Steamer. Businesses of all kinds needed new goods, which were generally only available in the east. By the end of May 1849, 59 vessels, including 17 steamers, had disgorged about 4,000 passengers in San Francisco.

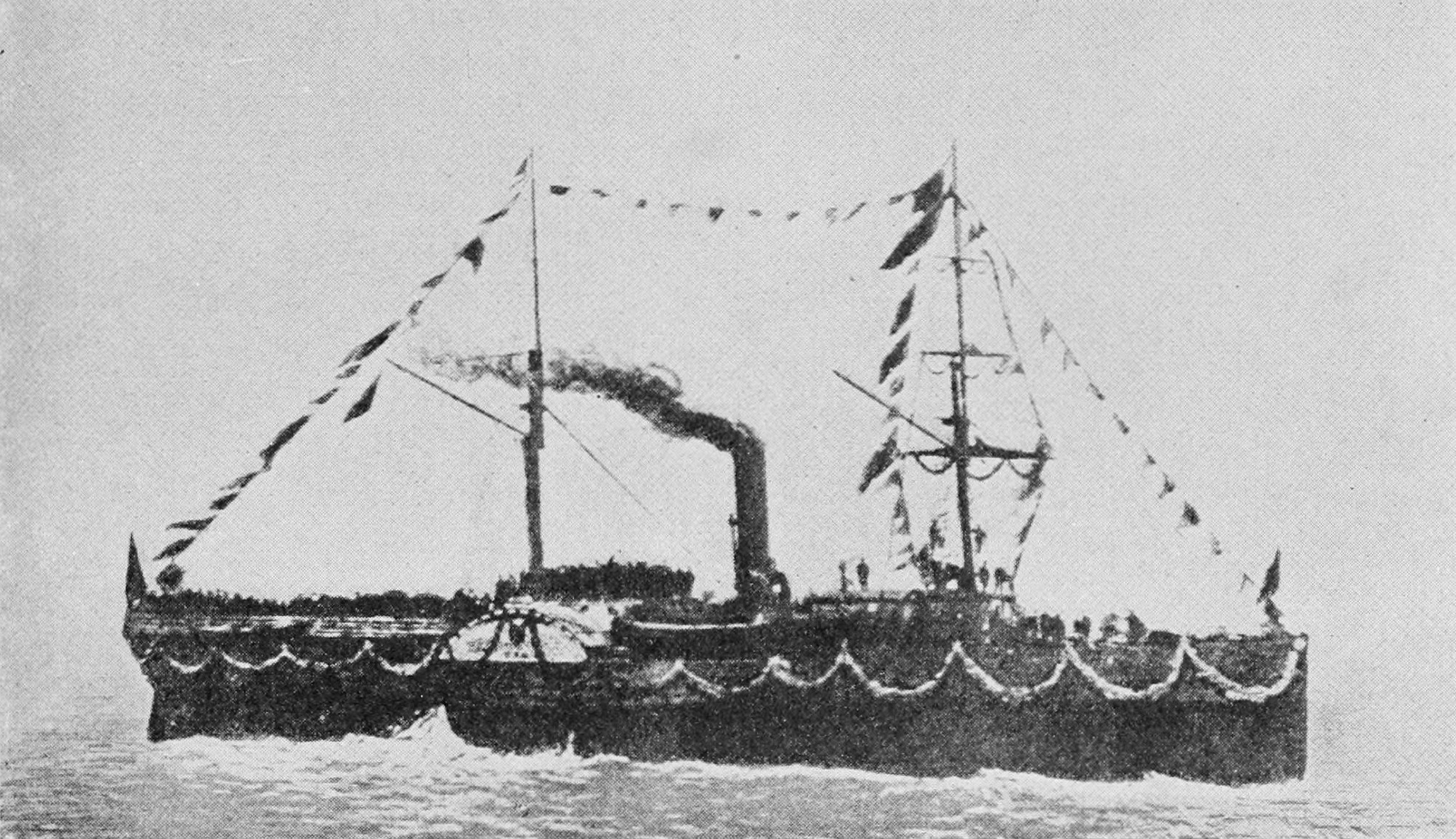
Photo of California, crowded with passengers and gaily decorated with flags and garlands, on February 28, 1874—the 25th anniversary of her historic entry into San Francisco Bay

As some of the early miners started returning to San Francisco with gold they had found, many bought tickets to return to the East Coast via Panama (the fastest and most popular return route), and there was soon a lucrative scheduled steamship route running to and from Panama City. Most of the gold found in California was eventually exported back to the East Coast via the Panama route. Well-guarded gold shipments regularly went to Panama, took a well-escorted mule and canoe trip to the mouth of the Chagres River, and then caught another steamship to the East Coast, usually New York City. As the Panama Railroad was being constructed, passengers, gold shipments, mail, etc. took advantage of its track as it crawled across Panama. These shipments and passengers helped pay for its construction, and after it was built made its 47 miles (76 km) of track some of the most lucrative in the world.

The first three steamships constructed for service in the Pacific were California (1848), SS Oregon (1848) and SS Panama (1848). Oregon was launched on August 5, 1848, by Smith & Dimon of New York and sailed from New York for San Francisco on December 8, 1848, calling at Panama City and arriving at San Francisco on April 1, 1849. The Oregon was used regularly on the Panama City-San Francisco route until 1855. The Panama was launched on July 29, 1848. She sailed from New York on February 15, 1849 and arrived in San Francisco on June 4. The trip from Panama City to San Francisco normally took about 17 days, and it took slightly less time to travel from San Francisco to Panama City. As more steamers became available, a regular schedule for mail, passengers, and cargo was a trip about every ten days to and from Panama City.

As the gold rush continued, the very lucrative San Francisco to Panama City route soon needed more and larger paddle steamers; ten more were eventually put into service. California was soon dwarfed by much larger ships built to carry more passengers and freight. She operated regularly between San Francisco and Panama from 1849 to 1854, then was put to use as a spare steamer in 1856. In 1875, she was converted into a sailing ship and her engine removed. Rigged as a bark, she was engaged in hauling coal and lumber until she wrecked near Pacasmayo Province, Peru in 1895.

== Ship log ==
Log of the SS California Captain Cleveland Forbes **
Location	Date	Time
Left New York	*October 6, 1848	at 6.50 P.M.
Near Bermuda	October 9, 1848
Crossed Equator heading south	October 24, 1848
Passed Fernando de Noronha	October 25, 1848
Arrived at Rio de Janeiro‡‡	November 2, 1848	at 4 P.M.
Left Rio de Janeiro	*November 25, 1848	at 5 P.M.
Navigating Straits of Magellan	December 7–12, 1848
Arrived at Valparaíso (Chile)	December 16, 1848	at 9 A.M.
Left Valparaíso	December 22, 1848	at 5 P.M.
Anchored at Callao Roads	December 27, 1848	at 10 A.M.
Left Callao (near Lima Peru)	January 10, 1849	at 6.30 P.M.
Arrived at Paita (Peru)	*January 12, 1849	at 9 A.M.
Left Paita	January 14, 1849	at 12 noon
Crossed Equator heading North	January 15, 1849
Arrived Panama	*January 17, 1849	at 12 noon
Left Panama City	February 1, 1849
Arrived Acapulco (Mexico)	February 9, 1849
Left Acapulco	February 11, 1849
Arrived San Blas, Nayarit (Mexico)	February 13, 1849
Left San Blas	February 14, 1849
Arrived at Mazatlan (Mexico)	February 15, 1849
Left Mazatlan (Mexico)	February 15, 1849
Arrived at San Diego (Cal.)	February 20, 1849
Arrived at Monterey (Cal.)	February 23, 1849	at 11 A.M.
Left Monterey	February 27, 1849	at 7 P.M.
Arrived at San Francisco	February 28, 1849	at 10 A.M.

The log of the SS California was originally published in the New Orleans Daily Picayune (February 23, 1849, Evening Edition). All dates are given in sea time. Navigators begin their day at noon, because that's when their latitude is normally determined by observation of the sun, while the longitude is also normally determined during the daytime by referencing a chronometer and an astronomical almanac. c. The navigator's count of days is one day in advance of that of the astronomer's (and civilian's) calendar.

‡‡ The trip from New York City to Rio de Janeiro took 24 days and broke existing records. The engine's necessary repairs and a sick captain contributed to the long stay at Rio.

== Sunk ==
The SS California wrecked and sank in the Pacific Ocean near Pacasmayo Province, Peru in 1895. There were no deaths. At the time, she had been reconstructed as a bark and engaged in hauling coal and lumber. On her last run, she had left Port Hadlock in Washington state with a cargo of lumber valued at $3,000.
