= Pacific Mail Steamship Company =

American shipping company (1848-1949)

- Industry: Transportation
- Founded: 1848
- Defunct: 1949 (de jure), 1925 (de facto)
- Footnotes House Flag

The Pacific Mail Steamship Company was founded April 18, 1848, as a joint stock company under the laws of the State of New York by a group of New York City merchants. Incorporators included William H. Aspinwall, Edwin Bartlett (American consul at Lima, Peru and also involved with the Panama Railroad Company), Henry Chauncey, Mr. Alsop, G.G. Howland and S.S. Howland.

== History ==
=== Founding ===
The Pacific Mail Steamship Company was established to carry US mail on the Pacific leg of a transcontinental route via Panama. The federal government discussed the possibility of creating subsidies for a private shipping company, similar to the model already established in Britain for the Cunard Line and the British Mail Steam Packet Company. Such a policy served the larger objective of annexing and developing Oregon. President James K. Polk brought the Oregon Territory into the Union in 1846. Developing and maintaining the new land required the development of faster transportation and communications between the eastern seaboard and the remote northwest.

At first, the federal mail subsidy program served a second objective: the establishment of civilian steamships which could be easily converted to warships or privateers during times of war. Thus the 1845 federal enabling legislation vested authority of mail contracts with the Secretary of the US Navy. His dual mandate was letting federal mail contracts and overseeing the construction of the steamers to ensure that they would be suitable for conversion to warships. In accordance to Polk’s aggressive program for developing Oregon, Congress passed more specific laws in for mail subsidies early in 1847. The new laws approved funding for four naval steamers, directed the US Department of the Navy to supervise the construction of these ships, and directed the Secretary of the Navy to contract with private carriers to carry US Mail to Oregon via Panama. Initially they planned for monthly mail service. One set of ships was to serve the Atlantic leg between the eastern US and Panama; the other set was to serve the Pacific leg.

Secretary Mason set the terms for the Pacific mail contract: a steamer would be required to sail from Panama to Astoria, Oregon in thirty days or less. He awarded the first contract to Arnold Harris, a straw buyer from Arkansas. The contract paid $199,000 annually and was in effect for ten years. Just days later, Harris assigned the mail contract to William H. Aspinwall, who brought in three partners: Edwin Bartlett, Henry Chauncey, and Gardiner Greene Howland. They incorporated the Pacific Mail Steamship Company on April 12, 1848 with a capital stock of $500,000.

=== California Gold Rush ===
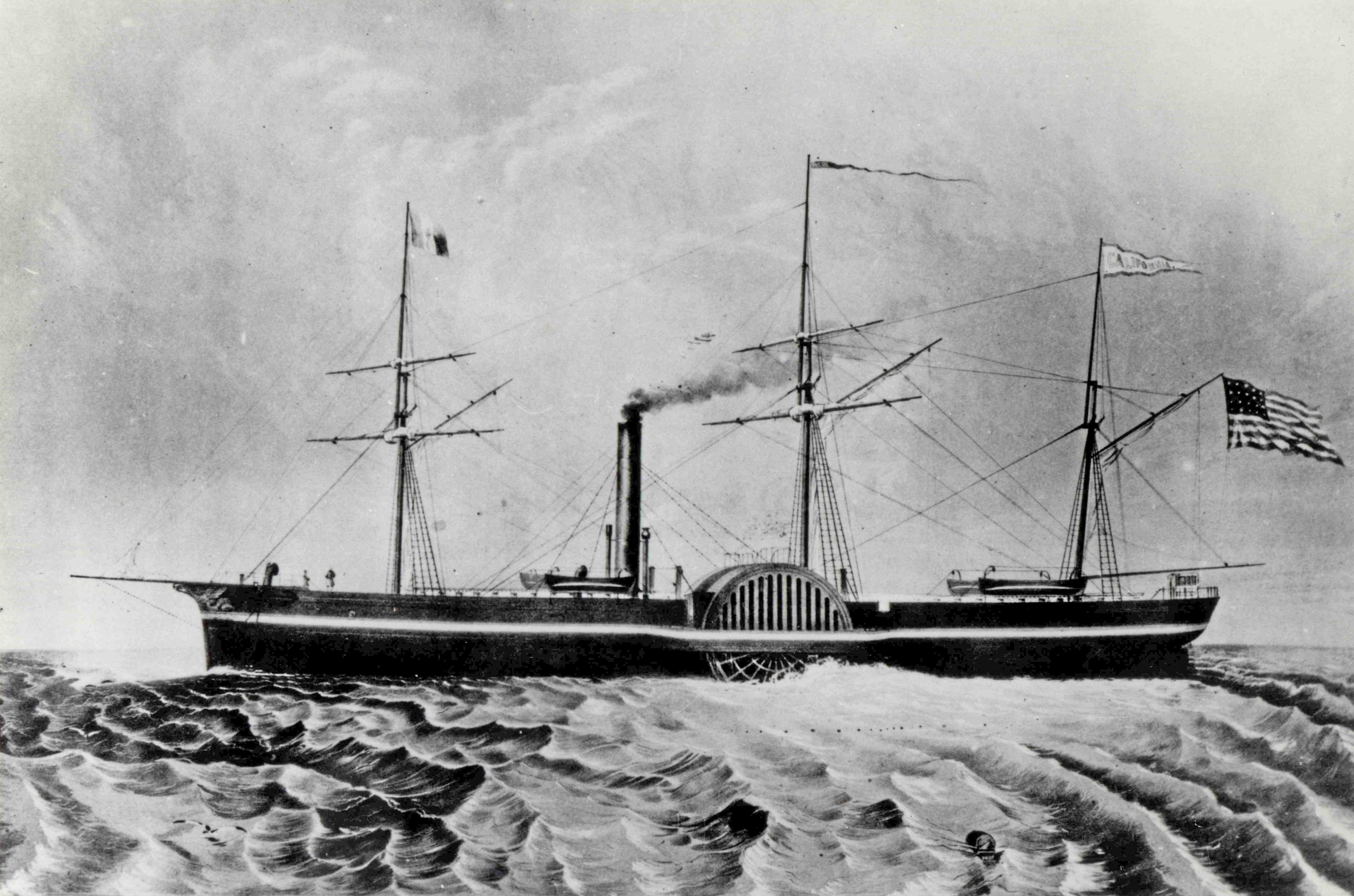
SS California, Pacific Mail's first ship

The first three steamships constructed for Pacific Mail were the SS California, of 1050 tons, the SS Oregon, of 1250 tons, and the SS Panama, of 1058 tons. The company initially believed it would be transporting agricultural goods from the West Coast, but just as operations began, gold was found in the Sierra Nevada, and business boomed almost from the start. During the California Gold Rush in 1849, the company was a key mover of goods and people and played a key role in the growth of San Francisco, California.

In addition to their maritime activities, Pacific Mail also ran some of the earliest steamboats on the Sacramento and San Joaquin Rivers, between San Francisco, Sacramento, and Stockton. Domingo Marcucci came from Philadelphia in the Pacific Mail steamship SS Oregon with a knocked-down steamboat in its hold. He started a shipyard in San Francisco on September 18, 1849, on the beach at Happy Valley, at the foot of Folsom Street, east of Beale Street. Marcucci's company assembled the Captain Sutter in six weeks. Built for the Aspinwall Steam Transportation Line, owned by George W. Aspinwall, brother of William Henry Aspinwall, it was one of the first steamboats that ran between San Francisco and Stockton, in 1849. Also for the Pacific Mail, Marcucci next converted the 153 ton side-wheel steamboat El Dorado that had been rigged as a 3 masted schooner for the trip around Cape Horn, to be used for the Sacramento run. Subsequently in March 1850, for the same company, he assembled the Georgiana, a small 30 ton side-wheel steamboat made in Philadelphia, knocked down and sent by sea also for the Sacramento run. That April Georgiana pioneered the shortcut route between Sacramento and Stockton through a slough in the Sacramento–San Joaquin River Delta that was between the Sacramento River and Mokelumne River, which afterward became known as Georgiana Slough.

=== 1850–1869 ===
In 1850, the Pacific Mail Steamship Company established a steamship line competing with the U.S. Mail Steamship Company between New York City and Chagres. George Law placed an opposition line of steamers (SS Antelope, SS Columbus, SS Isthumus, SS Republic) in the Pacific, running from Panama to San Francisco. In April 1851, the rivalry was ended when the U.S. Mail Steamship Company purchased Pacific Mail steamers on the Atlantic side, and George Law sold his new company and its ships to the Pacific Mail. One of the company's steamships, the SS Winfield Scott, acquired when the New York and California Steamship Company went out of business, ran aground on Anacapa Island in 1853. In 1854, Marshall Owen Roberts purchased Law's interest and became president of Pacific Mail.

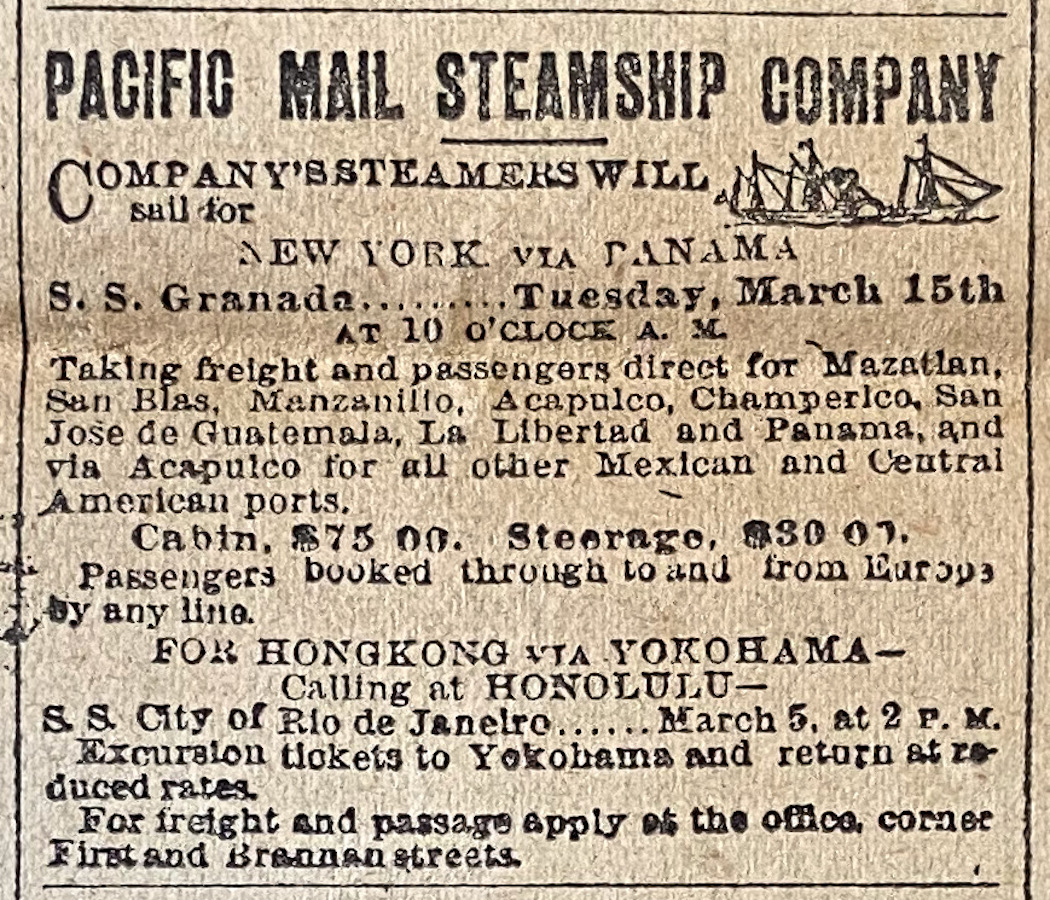
Advertisement from The Daily Examiner of 1887

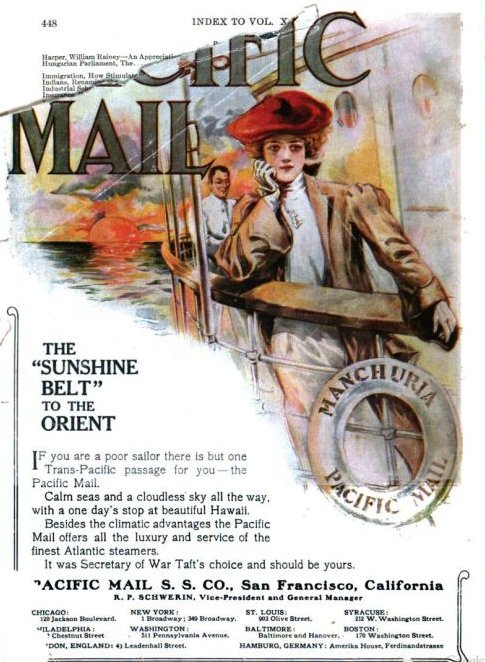
1906 Advertisement from The World Today magazine

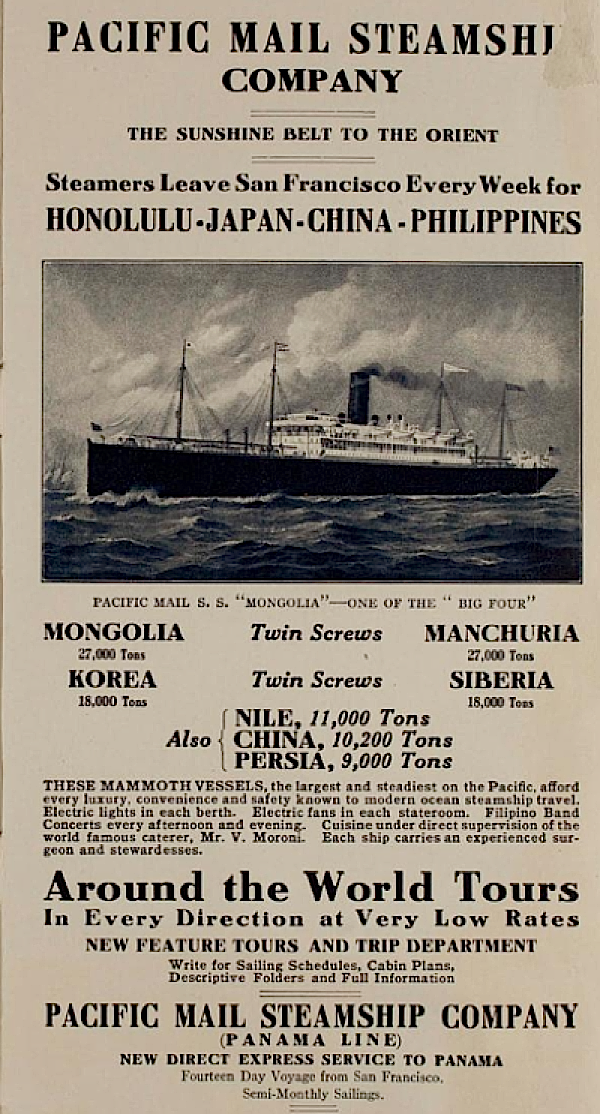
1915 Advertisement showing new ships in Trans Pacific service.

During the American Civil War, the ships of the Pacific Mail, that carried the gold and silver of the western mines to the eastern states were under threat from the Confederate Navy in the form of commerce raiders, and several plots to seize one of their steamships for its precious cargo or to convert it into a raider to capture one of its other ships with such cargo. After one of these plots, that of the Salvador Pirates came to light, to prevent any further attempts to seize Pacific coast shipping, General McDowell ordered each passenger on board American merchant steamers to surrender all weapons when boarding the ship and every passenger and his baggage was searched. All officers were armed for the protection of their ships. Detachments of Union soldiers sailed with Pacific Mail steamers.

In 1867, the company launched the first regularly scheduled trans-Pacific steamship service with a route between San Francisco, Hong Kong, and Yokohama, and extended service to Shanghai. This route led to an influx of Japanese and Chinese immigrants, bringing additional cultural diversity to California. Their warehouse in San Francisco, the Oriental Warehouse, was built in 1867 and was also used as an immigration station for a period.

As the Central Pacific and Union Pacific railroads met in Utah in 1869, the profitability of the Pacific Mail on the run from Panama to San Francisco ended. Many of its ships were sold or put on other routes.

=== 1870–1925 ===
While docked at San José de Guatemala, the Pacific Mail steamship SS Acapulco was involved in the Barrundia Affair of 1890. General Juan Martín Barrundia, a Guatemalan rebel general wanted by the Guatemalan government, was killed aboard ship after an attempted arrest by Guatemalan police, who hauled down the American flag and raised the Guatemalan flag in its place. The affair led to the recall of the U.S. Minister to Central America, Lansing Bond Mizner, by President Benjamin Harrison.

The company was a charter member of the Dow Jones Transportation Average.

In 1912, Congress banned ships owned by railroads from using the Panama Canal by means of the Panama Canal Act. Because of this, Pacific Mail was sold to Grace Shipping, a subsidiary of W.R. Grace and Company, which owned the company from 1916 to 1925.

In 1925, the transpacific fleet of company was purchased by Robert Dollar, of the Dollar Steamship Company. With the government bail-out of the Dollar Line in 1938, ownership passed to American President Lines, but by this time, PMSS essentially existed only on paper. It was formally closed down in 1949, after just over a century of existence.

== Gallery ==
House flag for Grace Line. Grace purchased Pacific Mail in 1916.

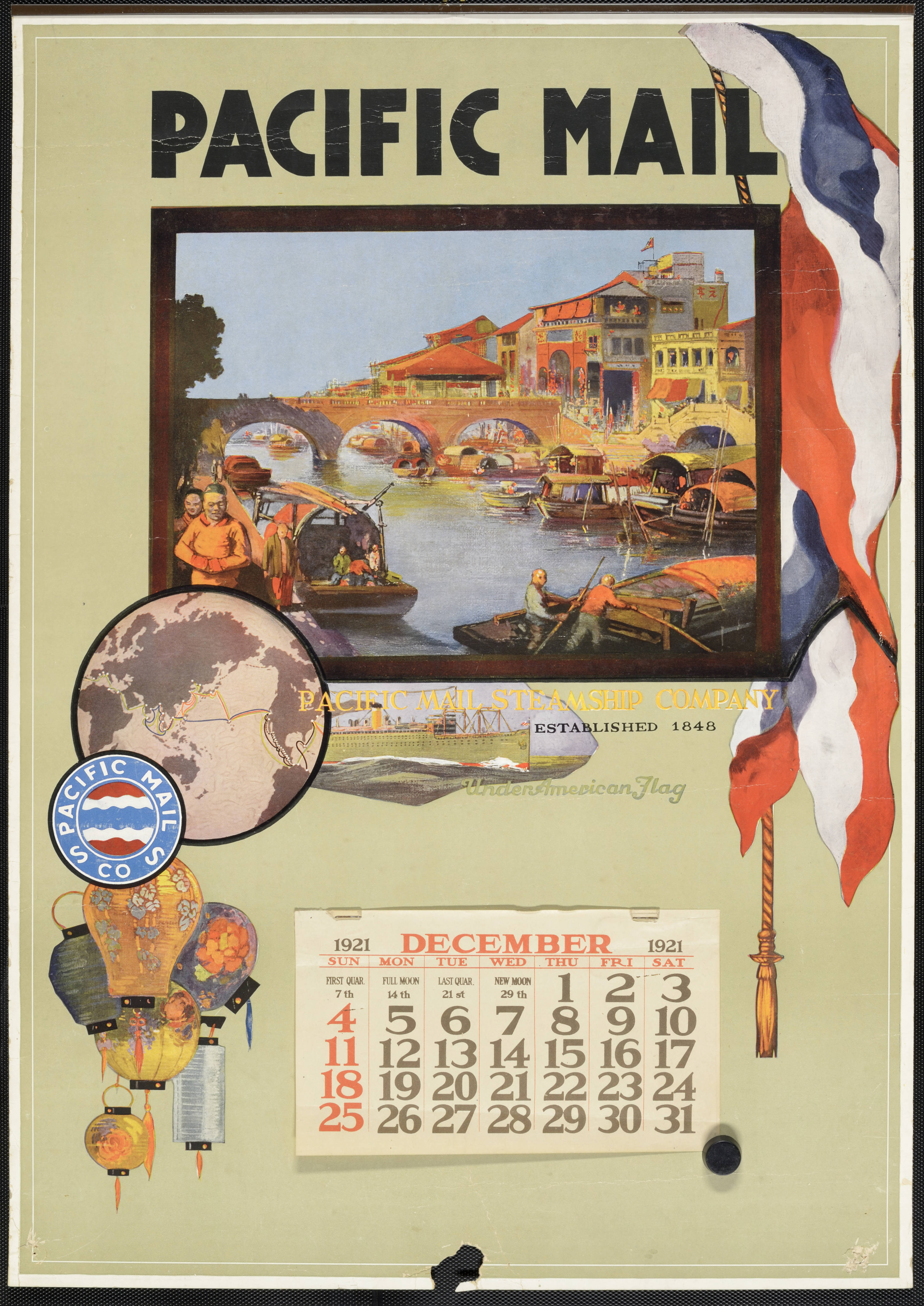
Pacific Mail calendar, December 1921

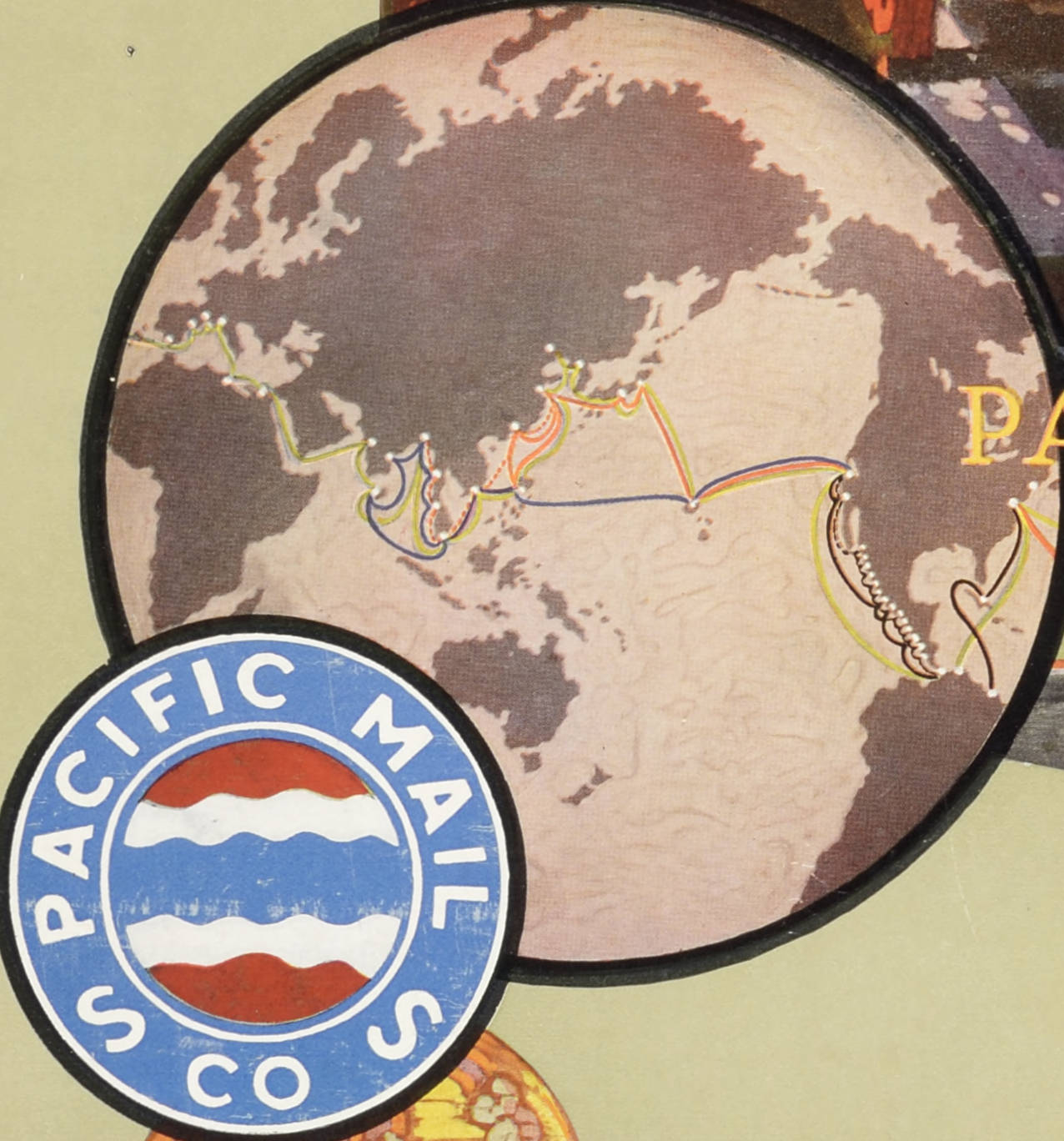
Artwork for Pacific Mail routes on world map as of December 1921.

== Ships of the Pacific Mail Steamship Company ==
- California (1848–1866, 1872–1874): Built for the company, it was launched May 19, 1848 by William H. Webb, New York. It left New York on October 6, 1848 for Valparaíso, Panama City and San Francisco and then operated between San Francisco and Panama regularly until 1854. She was used as a spare steamer at San Francisco in 1856 and at Panama City in 1857. She made San Francisco to Panama City voyages for Pacific Mail in 1860, 1861 and 1866 and was later sold to the California, Oregon & Mexico Steamship Company. Returned to Pacific Mail in 1872, she was sold to Goodall, Nelson & Perkins in 1874.
- Oregon (1848–1861): Built for the company, it was launched on August 5, 1848 and sailed from New York for San Francisco on December 8, 1848, calling at Panama City and arriving at San Francisco on April 1, 1849. Used regularly on the San Francisco to Panama City route until 1855 and made one further voyage in 1856. Subsequently used on the San Francisco to Columbia River service and was sold to Holladay & Flint in 1861.
- Panama (1848–1861): Built for the company, it was launched on July 29, 1848. She sailed from New York on February 15, 1849 and arrived San Francisco on June 4. She then sailed regularly between San Francisco and Panama City until 1853, made a single voyage in 1854 and in 1856–57 was used as a spare steamer at Panama City. From 1858 she was used on the San Francisco to Columbia River service, until she was sold to Holladay & Flint in February 1861. The Panama was sold to the Mexican government in 1868 and was renamed the Juarez.
- Tennessee (1849–1853): Launched in 1848. Purchased by Pacific Mail Steamship Company, she left New York on December 6, 1849, arrived at Panama City on March 12, 1850 and San Francisco on April 14. She operated between San Francisco and Panama City until March 6, 1853 when she went aground in dense fog near San Francisco and broke up. Her passengers, mail and baggage were saved.
- Carolina (1849–1854): Completed in December 1849, she was sold to Pacific Mail Steamship Company and sailed from New York for San Francisco on January 9, 1850 arriving in San Francisco on May 7, 1850. She was used on the San Francisco to Panama City service until the end of 1851. Sold for service in China in 1854.
- Unicorn (1850–1853): Built in 1838, she sailed from New York for California and arrived at San Francisco on December 1, 1849, having been chartered by Pacific Mail Steamship Company, who purchased her in 1850. She operated occasionally between San Francisco and Panama City until April 1853 when she was sold and returned to England via Australia.
- Columbia (1850–1862): Built for the company in 1850 and sailed from New York for San Francisco on October 15, 1850. She was intended for the mail service between San Francisco and Astoria, Oregon, but the amount of business between San Francisco and Panama City caused her to be used in that service occasionally between 1851 and 1854. Sold to Chinese owners in 1862.
- Ecuador (1850–1853): Built for the Pacific Steam Navigation Company in 1845 for the Callao – Guayaquil – Panama City service she made one voyage from Panama City to San Francisco in July–August 1850. In 1850 she was sold to the Pacific Mail Steamship Company, and was wrecked at Coquimbo in 1853.
- Crescent City and Empire City (1850–1851): Purchased for New York City to Chagres voyages; sold in 1851 to U.S. Mail Steamship Company.
- Sarah Sands (1850–1851): Built in 1846, she operated between Liverpool and New York until chartered to the Empire City Line and operated from San Francisco to Panama City until October 1850 when she was purchased by the Pacific Mail Steamship Company. She continued operating on that route until July 1851. She was then sold and returned to England via Australia and resumed transatlantic voyages to Canada until chartered by the British government for transporting troops to the Crimea and later India in response to the Indian Mutiny. While on the way to India in 1857 the ship suffered a notable fire, but survived only to be later wrecked in India.
- Northerner (1850–1860): Built in 1847, she arrived in San Francisco on August 15, 1850, and made one voyage to Panama City for the Empire City Line before being sold to the Pacific Mail Steamship Company in December 1850. She was used on the San Francisco to Panama City service until May 1853. She was then used as a spare steamer and later placed on the San Francisco – Columbia River and Puget Sound service. A state historic landmark, cross and monument mark the spot where she was wrecked near Humboldt Bay on January 7, 1860 with the loss of 38 lives.
- Fremont (1851–1861): Built 1850, she was purchased by Pacific Mail Steamship Company and sent to San Francisco in 1851. Used on the San Francisco – Panama City service until spring 1852, she was then used on the San Francisco to Columbia River service. In February 1861 she was sold to Flint & Holladay for their coastal routes.
- Republic (1851–1861): In early 1850 she was sold to Howard & Aspinwall and was sent to the Pacific coast, arriving at Panama City on July 15, 1850. She then entered service between Panama City and San Francisco for George Law. Sold to the Pacific Mail Steamship Company in January 1851, and used mostly on coastal services with occasional voyages to Panama City until 1855. Sold to Holladay & Flint in 1861.
- Isthumus (1851–1854): Formerly used between San Francisco and Panama for George Law between May 4, 1850 and April 1851, she was then purchased by Pacific Mail Steamship Company. She made occasional Panama City voyages until late 1853, when she was put on the San Francisco to San Diego service. She was sold in January 1854 and renamed Southerner.
- Columbus (1851–1854): Sailed from New York on February 12, 1850 and arrived San Francisco June 6, 1850. Sold to the Pacific Mail Steamship Company in 1851, it operated on the San Francisco to Panama City route until 1854. Chartered to the U. S. Navy for a while in 1854 she was then sold to the Panama Railroad Company and operated on the west coast of Central America.
- Antelope (1851): Operated between San Francisco and Panama between October 1850 and March 1851 for George Law. Sold to Pacific Mail Steamship Company in the spring of 1851, and resold for use on the Sacramento River.

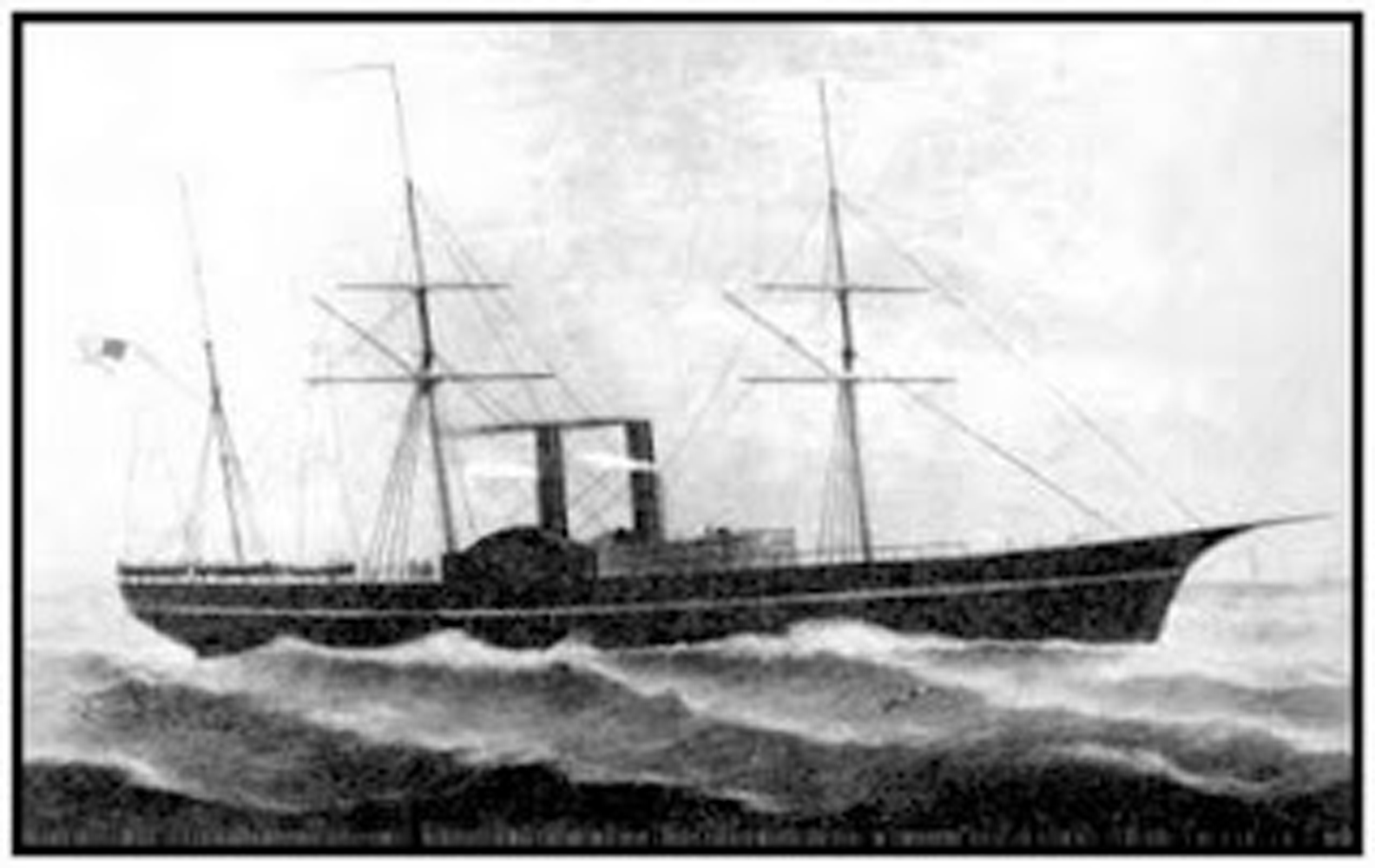
The S.S. Golden Gate entered the San Francisco to Panama City service in November 1851 and was lost off Manzanillo, Mexico on July 27, 1862.

- Golden Gate (1851–1862): Built and launched for the Pacific Mail Steamship Company on January 21, 1851, she entered the San Francisco to Panama City service in November 1851. She stayed in this service until she was beached and was burned at sea near Manzanillo, Mexico on July 27, 1862 with the loss of 223 lives.
- Constitution (1851): Built in 1850, she made a voyage between San Francisco and Panama for Pacific Mail Steamship Company in 1851.
- John L. Stephens: Launched on September 21, 1852 for the Pacific Mail Steamship Company. She left New York for San Francisco on December 17, 1852 and arrived with passengers from Panama City on April 3, 1853. She continued the San Francisco to Panama route until October 1860. In 1864 she was sailing between San Francisco and the Columbia River. She was sold in 1878 to Sisson, Wallace & Co., and went to Alaska, used as a floating cannery.
- San Francisco (1853): Built in New York. Sank off the coast of the Carolinas on 6 January 1854 while on its maiden voyage from New York to San Francisco, in heavy weather, with hundreds of casualties when the engines broke down.
- Winfield Scott (1853): Built and launched in October 1850. She arrived at San Francisco in April 1852 and operated to Panama City until April 1853 for the Independent Line, then for the New York & San Francisco Steamship Company. She was then purchased by the Pacific Mail Steamship Company in July 1853, but was then wrecked on Anacapa Island in thick fog when bound for Panama City on December 2, 1853. There was no loss of life.
- Sonora (1853–1868): Built for the Pacific Mail Steamship Company, she was launched on 1 October 1853. She left New York on March 11, 1854 and arrived San Francisco on May 31. Used on the San Francisco to Panama City service until May 1863. She made one voyage to Panama City with troops in 1865 and was scrapped in 1868.
- St. Louis (1854–1855, 1859–1878): Built and launched for Pacific Mail Steamship Company on February 1, 1854, she was chartered to the New York & Havre Steam Navigation Company and sailed from New York for Havre on August 1, 1854. Sold to the U.S. Mail Steamship Company in August 1855 and made occasional New York to Aspinwall voyages between 1855 and 1859. Returned to Pacific Mail Steamship Company when the U.S. Mail Steamship Company dissolved, she sailed from New York on November 22, 1860 and arrived in San Francisco via Panama City on February 9, 1861. She then operated between San Francisco and Panama City until 1866. She was scrapped in 1878.
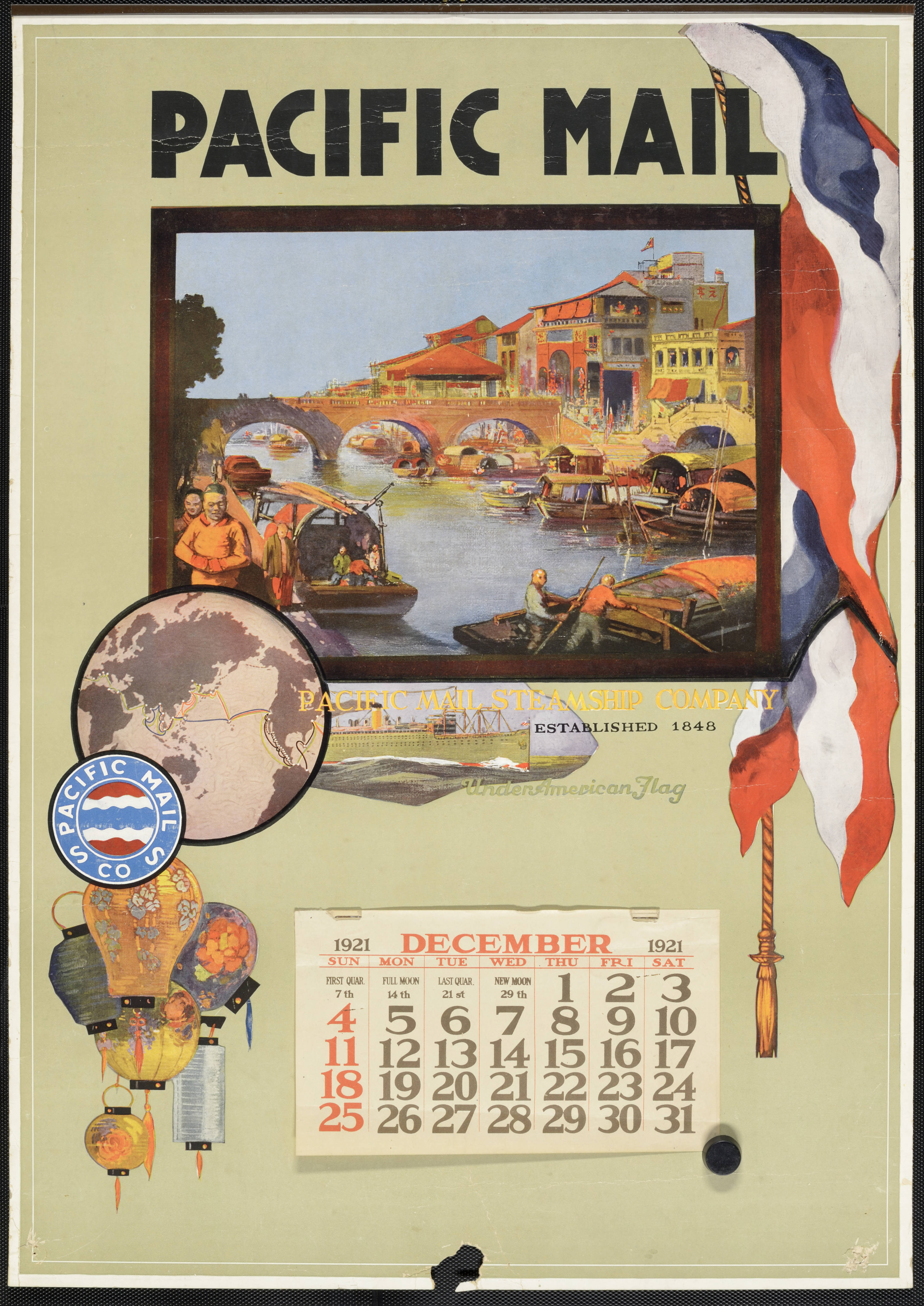
- Pacific Mail- Pacific Mail Steamship Company- under American flag in 1921
  Golden Age (1854–1862): Built for New York & Australian Navigation Company in 1853, she operated in Australian coastal services until May 12, 1854 when she sailed from Sydney for Tahiti and Panama City, arriving June 17. She was purchased by the Pacific Mail Steamship Company in August 1854, she entered the San Francisco to Panama City service in October 1854 and continued until 1869. Later transferred to the Yokohama to Shanghai service, she was sold to Mitsubishi Mail Steamship Company in 1875 and renamed Hiroshima Maru.
- Cortes (1860–1861): In 1858–1859 she was sailing between San Francisco and Panama City for the New York & California Steamship Company and in 1860 on the same route for the Atlantic & Pacific Steamship Company. She was purchased by Pacific Mail Steamship Company in December 1860, she entered its Panama service and in February 1861 was sold to Flint & Holladay who chartered her for service in China.
- Orizaba (1860–1865, 1872–1875): a 1450-ton, wooden hull, side paddle wheel, two masted steamship with accommodation for 1,028 passengers. Launched on January 14, 1854 by Jacob A. Westervelt & Co, New York for Morgan & Harris for the New York – New Orleans – Vera Cruz service. She made two New York – San Juan de Nicaragua sailings in Apr-May 1856 and was then sent to San Francisco, arriving Oct. 30th. She operated for Vanderbilt's Nicaragua Steamship Company until Feb.1857 and after Apr.1858 sailed from San Francisco to Panama for the New York & California Steamship Company. Purchased by Pacific Mail Steamship Company in 1860 and sailed the San Francisco – Panama City route between June 1, 1861 and April 1864. Sold to the California Steam Navigation Company in April 1865 and used on their San Francisco – Portland – Victoria service until 1867 when she was sold to Holladay & Brenham. Purchased again by Pacific Mail Steamship Company in 1872 and by Goodall, Nelson & Perkins in 1875. She remained in coastal services throughout all these changes of ownership and was scrapped in 1887.
- Uncle Sam (1860–1866): Launched in 1852, she passed through various hands until making one Panama City to San Francisco voyage for the Atlantic & Pacific Steamship Company in January 1860. Later that year she was purchased and operated by the Pacific Mail Steamship Company. She made her last San Francisco to Panama Panama City voyage in December 1861 and was sold in February 1866 to James Hermann & Company, Panama City.
- Washington (1860–1864): Built in 1847 she operated transatlantic services and then made New York to San Juan de Nicaragua and Aspinwall sailings until she was sold to the Pacific Mail Steamship Company in 1860. She arrived at San Francisco on October 24, 1860 and made two San Francisco to Panama City voyages before being laid up as unfit for the service. She was scrapped in 1864.
- Constitution (1861–1879): Built for the company, she was launched on May 25, 1861. She was chartered to the War Department in 1861–1862. On June 19, 1862 she sailed from New York for San Francisco. She sailed from then on between San Francisco and Panama City from 1862 to June 1869. She was scrapped at San Francisco in 1879.
- Golden City: Launched January 24, 1863 for the Pacific Mail Steamship Company she entered the San Francisco to Panama City service on August 13, 1863 and continued this until 1869. She was lost on the coast of Baja California on February 10, 1870.
- Costa Rica (1865–1875): The Costa Rica operated for Cornelius Vanderbilt from July 1864 until the summer of 1865 on the New York to Aspinwall service. Purchased by Pacific Mail Steamship Company, she was used on the same service until spring 1866. On April 1, 1867 she sailed from New York for Yokohama via the Cape of Good Hope and was then used on Pacific Mail's Yokohama to Shanghai service until 1875 when she was sold to Mitsubishi Mail Steamship Company and renamed Genaki Maru.
- Guatemala (?–1864–?): Pacific Mail Steamship Company ship operating between Panama City and ports along the coast of Central America in 1864 when it was the target of a Confederate Navy attempt to seize it.
- San Salvador (?–1864–?): Pacific Mail Steamship Company ship operating from Panama City in 1864 when it was the target of a Confederate Navy attempt to seize it.
- Colorado (1864–1878): Built for the Pacific Mail Steamship Company, launched on May 21, 1864 and sailed from New York for San Francisco on April 1, 1865 with calls at Rio de Janeiro, Callao and Panama City. Used on the San Francisco to Panama City service from summer 1865 to June 1869 with the exception of some occasional voyages on the China route. Sold in 1878 and scrapped 1879.
- Henry Chauncey (1864–1877): Launched October 1864 for the Pacific Mail Steamship Company and entered the New York to Aspinwall service on November 1, 1865 and remained on this route until 1869. She burned at sea on August 16, 1871 off the Carolina Coast while on passage from New York to Kingston, Jamaica and Aspinwall with no loss of life. The hull was rebuilt and she was eventually scrapped in 1877.
- Arizona (1865–1877): Built and launched for Pacific Mail Steamship Company on January 19, 1865. She commenced service between New York and Aspinwall on March 1, 1866 and continued until June 1869. In 1877 she was scrapped at San Francisco.
- Montana (1865–1876): Launched February 25, 1865 for the Pacific Mail Steamship Company. She was used on the San Francisco to Panama City service from October 1866 through 1869. She was sold to the Colorado Steam Navigation Company in 1874. However, later that year, Montana ran aground and had to be towed back to San Francisco for 3 months of repairs. She caught fire and sank near Guaymas, on December 14, 1876.
- Atlantic (1865): In 1865 she made one New York to Aspinwall voyage for the Pacific Mail Steamship Company.
- Baltic (1865): In 1865 she made one New York to Aspinwall sailing for Pacific Mail Steamship Company.
- Hermann: Built in 1848 for Transatlantic service, she was sold in 1858 operated on the west coast of North America on various routes until the winter of 1862–1863 when she made one San Francisco to Panama City voyage for the People's Line and was then auctioned in 1866. Sold to Pacific Mail Steamship Company, she was refitted and sent to Yokohama for use as a store ship on March 1, 1867. On February 13, 1869 she was wrecked on Point Kwatzu with the loss of 330 lives.
- China (1866–1883): Built for the Pacific Mail's transpacific service and launched on December 8, 1866. Left New York for San Francisco on July 1, 1867 and arrived in San Francisco on September 20, picking up passengers at Panama City on the way. She then entered the transpacific service until 1883 when she was sold to Henry Villard.
- Great Republic (1867–1878): Built for the Pacific Mail Steamship Company in 1867. She sailed from New York on May 18, 1867 for Panama City, San Francisco and Japan and arrived in Panama City on July 16. She made one Panama to San Francisco voyage on July 2, arriving August 2, 1867 and then entered the San Francisco to Hong Kong service. She was sold to P. B. Cornwall in 1878 for the San Francisco to Portland route until she was wrecked on April 19, 1879 on Sand Island, Columbia River.

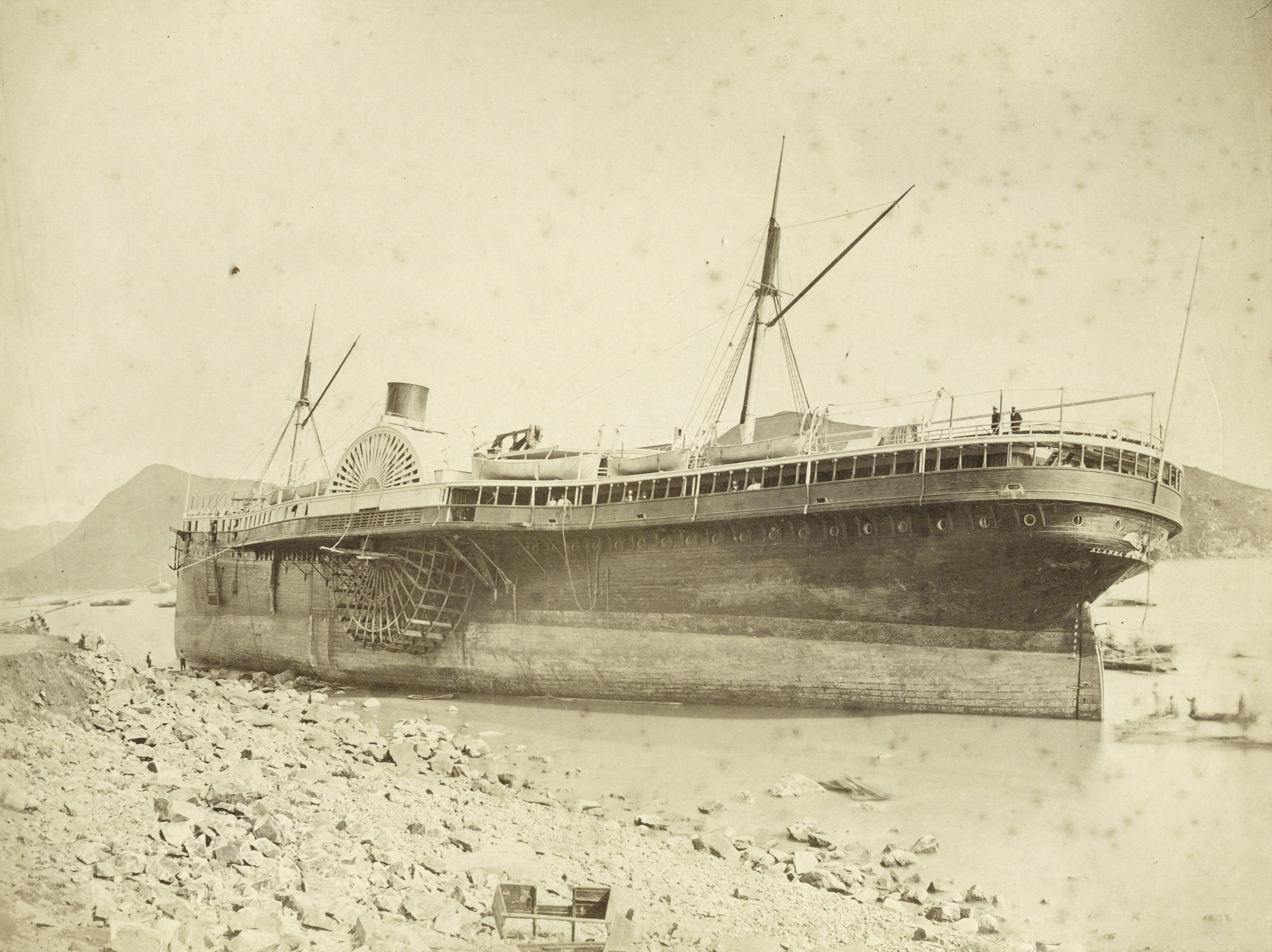
SS Alaska, after being blown ashore during the 1874 Hong Kong Typhoon. Photo by Lai Afong.

- Alaska (1867–1879): Launched November 27, 1867 for Pacific Mail Steamship Company service between New York and Aspinwall. She served from August 2, 1868 until June 1869 and later was used on the San Francisco to Panama City and San Francisco to Hong Kong services until 1879. She was rebuilt in 1882 and later became a coal hulk and store ship at Acapulco until 1885.
- Japan (1867–1874): Launched on December 17, 1867 for the Pacific Mail Steamship Company she sailed from New York on April 11, 1868 for Panama, San Francisco and Yokohama. She arrived in San Francisco on July 3, 1868 and entered the San Francisco to Hong Kong service. She burned at sea on 18 December 1874 between Hong Kong and Yokohama.
- America (1869–1872): Launched in 1869. It travelled around the Cape of Good Hope without passengers and used sail for a large part of the trip. At Singapore America began to pick up Chinese for steerage passage and eventually arrived in San Francisco on 20 October 1869 with 730 immigrants. The SS America was lost by fire on August 24, 1872 in Yokohama harbor. Captain Seth Doane had inspected the ship before 10 o'clock. A loss of 19 to 70 lives occurred depending on the sources.
- Moses Taylor (1875–?): Built in 1858, she was used on both coasts for many years until San Francisco – Honolulu – Australia Line sold it to the Pacific Mail Steamship Company that converted it to a store ship in 1875.
- Pacific (1872–1875): Launched September 1850 she was used on the New York – Chagres service, San Francisco – Panama service, and San Francisco – San Juan del Sur route until 1855. Laid up until 1858, she was purchased by Merchants Accommodation Line and was employed on the San Francisco – Columbia River route. In 1872, Pacific Mail Steamship Company purchased her for coastal services until she was sold to Goodall, Nelson & Perkins in 1875.
- Ariel (1873): Launched in 1855 she made a New York – Aspinwall and Transatlantic voyages until Summer 1865 but was chartered to the War Department in 1861,1862,1864 and 1865. After the American Civil War she was used for transatlantic service but in 1873 was running between Hakodate and Yokohama for the Pacific Mail Steamship Company when on October 27, 1873 she struck a sunken reef 110 miles off Yokohama and sank.
- Dakota (1873–1886): Built and launched for William H. Webb in 1865 and after being used briefly on the San Francisco to Australia service in 1873 for William H.Webb was then sold to Pacific Mail Steamship Company. She was then scrapped in 1886.
- Acapulco (1873–1916): Built and launched by Harlan & Hollingsworth of Wilmington, Delaware in 1873. With the SS Granada one of the first two iron steamships built for the U.S. Pacific Coast. Originally built intended for the Pacific Steamship Company's Eastern (China) trade; later used on the Panama to San Francisco service. Single-screw iron steamship, 2,572 tons displacement, twin 1,500 hp compound (hi/lo) steam engines, length 280 feet, beam 40 feet, passenger capacity: 200, cargo capacity 2,200 tons plus 500 tons of coal. In 1916, sold to Western Fuel Co. and converted to a barge.

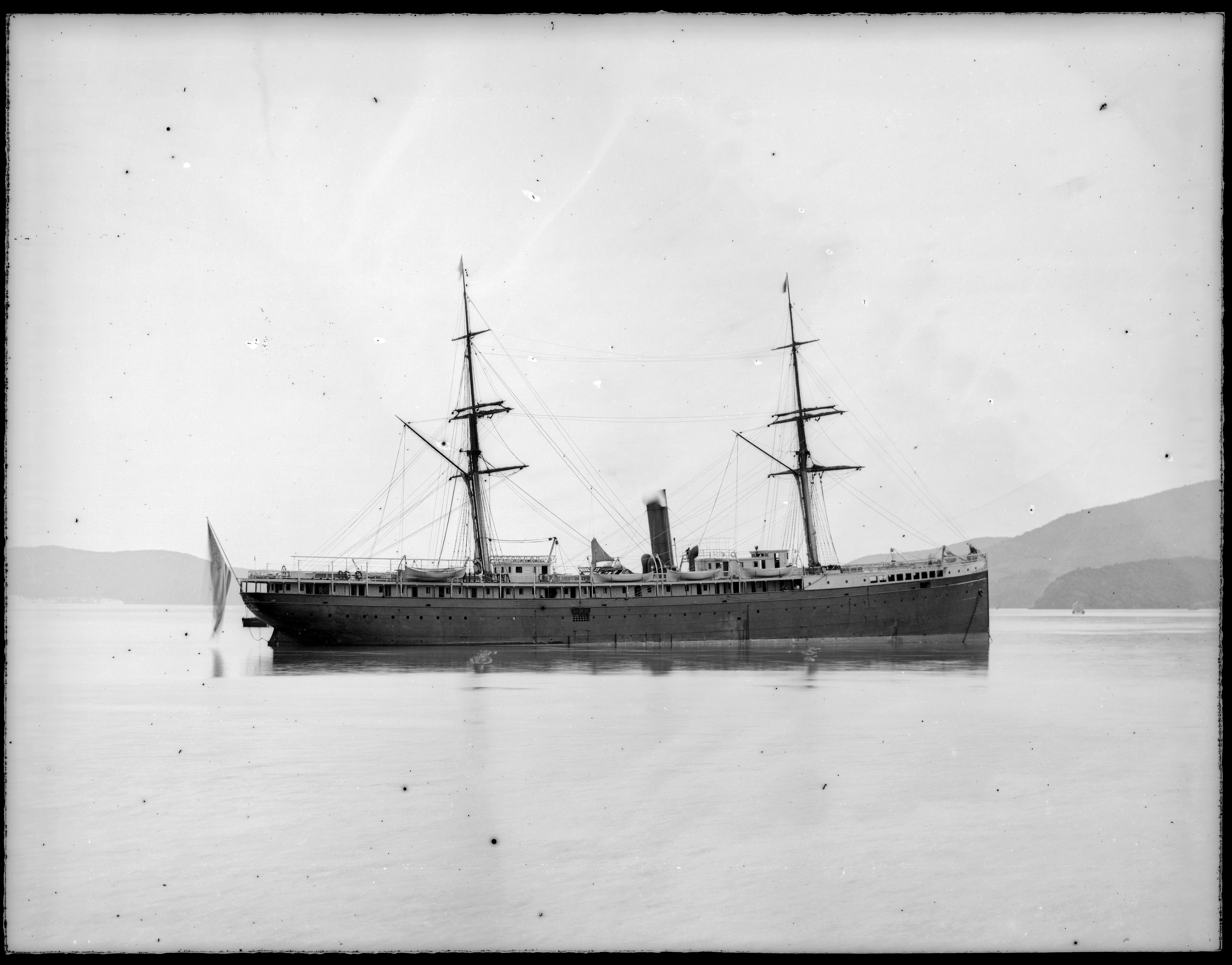
The SS Granada in Otago Harbour, 1876

- Granada: See comments for SS Acapulco and the 1887 Advertisement. Granada sister ship was the SS Colina.
- Australia: Built by the firm of John Elder and Co., she became a Pacific Mail Steamship Company vessel c. 1876. Length 376 feet (115 m), beam 37.5 feet (11.4 m), depth 38.75 feet (11.81 m), tonnage 2737 t. displacement. The vessel did the passenger and mail run from Sydney to San Francisco, via Auckland, and Kandavau. It was capable of carrying 139 mail bags, and 28 cabin and 46 steerage passengers.
- Zealandia: An earlier sister ship to the SS Australia.
- City of Rio de Janeiro (1881-1901) Built for the United States & Brazil Mail Steamship Company in 1878 she was purchased in 1881. On 22 February 1901, the vessel sank after striking a submerged reef at the entry to San Francisco Bay while inward bound from Hong Kong. Of the approximately 220 passengers and crew on board, fewer than 85 people survived the sinking, while 135 others were killed in the catastrophe.
- San Juan (1882–1925): Built and launched by W.Roach and Son of Chester, Pennsylvania in 1882. Her sister ship was the SS Humboldt. When the Pacific Mail Steamship Company ran into financial difficulties, she was sold to W.R. Grace and Company in New York City. She was then quickly sold off to the White Flyer Line due to her age. She was later sold to the Los Angeles and San Francisco Navigation Company along with the Humboldt. San Juan was lost on August 29, 1929 after a collision with the 9 year old Standard Oil Company tanker S.C.T. Dodd. San Juan sank in less than 3 minutes.
- Asia (1906-1911) Built by Harland & Wolff in 1883 as the White Star Line's Doric. Initially chartered to the Occidental and Oriental Steamship Company, she was sold to Pacific Mail after the winding up of the former company. She was wrecked near Taichow Islands, Wenzhou, South China in 1911.
- Persia (1906-1915) Built by Harland & Wolff in 1881 as the White Star Line's Coptic. Initially chartered to the Occidental and Oriental Steamship Company, she was sold to Pacific Mail after the winding up of the former company. Later sold to the Japanese Oriental Steam Ship Co. She was scrapped in 1926.
- Peru (1892-1915) A 3,615 GRT steamship built by Union Iron Works, San Francisco, for Pacific Mail launched June 11, 1892. Peru, official number 150595, was the largest steel freight and passenger ship ever built on the Pacific coast at the time. Peru entered the San Francisco to China and Japan route August 1892. The ship was briefly with Grace Line and then sold to a French line and renamed Lux about 1915. Lux went missing in the Mediterranean in 1920 on a voyage from Marseille to Oran.
- China 10,200 ton steamship.
- Nile 11,000 ton steamship.
- Korea 18,000 ton twin screw steamship.
- Siberia 18,000 ton twin screw steamship.
- Manchuria (1903-1915) 27,000 ton twin screw steamship.
- Mongolia (1904-1915) 27,000 ton twin screw steamship.

== See also ==
- History of American President Lines, Pacific Mail Company

== Sources ==
- Czernek, Andrew, "Sinking of the SS Golden Gate", originally published 1997; updated August 2018.
