= SS Panama =

SS Panama may refer to the following ships;

- SS Panama (1848), was a ship of the Pacific Mail Steamship Company.
- SS Panama (1875), a British-built ship captured by the United States while in Spanish service during the Spanish-American War and wrecked in 1899.
- SS Panama (1881), was a British ship that was wrecked in 1891.
- SS Panama was an 1898-built passenger liner of the Panama Railroad Steamship Company 1905–1926.
- SS Panama (1902), was purchased by the Royal Navy in 1920, renamed RFA Maine and served in the Mediterranean Fleet, on the China Station, and was based at Alexandria, Egypt, during World War II. She was decommissioned in 1947, and broken up.
- SS Panama (1939), was a ship of the Panama Line.
