= SS Oregonian =

At least two ships have been named SS Oregonian:

- SS Oregonian, a cargo ship launched in 1901. She was commissioned as USS Oregonian (ID-1323) between 1918 and 1919.
- SS Oregonian, a passenger/cargo liner launched in 1916 as SS Santa Rosa. She was renamed SS Oregonian in 1925 and was sunk in 1942.

See also

- SS Oregon
