= SS Golden Gate =

American steamer ship

S.S. Golden Gate
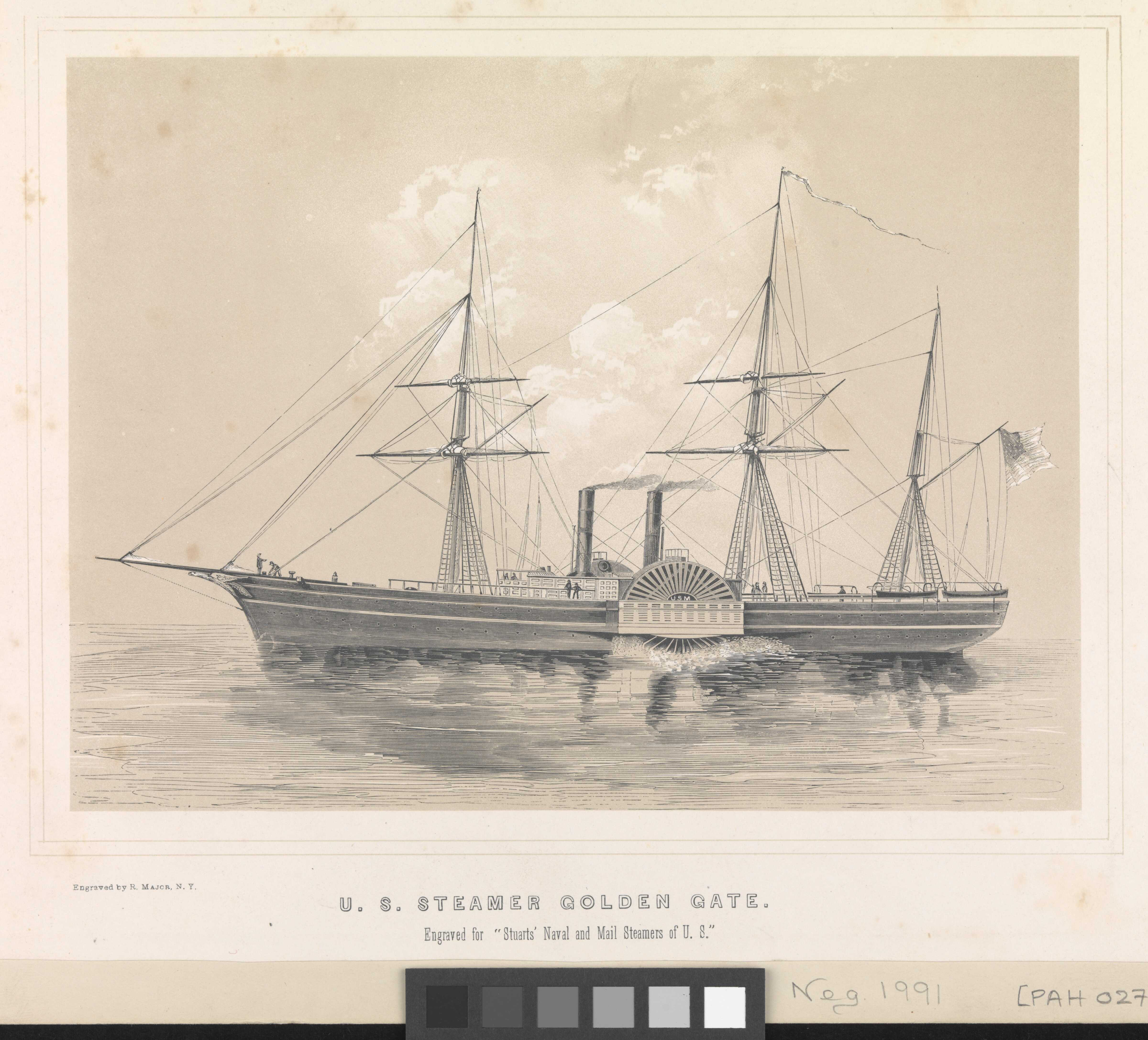
- Golden Gate (1951)

History
- Name: Golden Gate
- Owner: Pacific Mail Steamship Company
- Route: San Francisco – Panama City
- Builder: William H. Webb
- Laid down: 1 July 1850
- Launched: 1851
- Out of service: 27 July 1862
- Fate: Burned and sunk

General characteristics
- Type: Paddle steamer
- Tonnage: 2,067
- Length: 269 feet (82 m)
- Beam: 40 feet (12 m)
- Draft: 13 feet 8 inches (4.17 m)
- Decks: 3
- Propulsion: Side paddles
- Speed: 12 knots
- Capacity: 760 passengers
- Crew: 96

The S.S. Golden Gate was a mail and passenger steamer that operated between San Francisco and Panama City from 1851 to 1862. On its last voyage from San Francisco it caught fire and was destroyed with the loss of 204 lives off Manzanillo, Colima, Mexico. The ship was carrying $1,400,000 in gold coins for Wells Fargo, as well as large amounts of gold and coins for the passengers. Much of this was retrieved, but amateurs continue to search for gold with metal detectors on what is now called the Playa de Oro (Gold Beach).

== Construction ==
The Golden Gate was built by William H. Webb of New York for the Pacific Mail Steamship Company. The keel was laid down on 1 July 1850 at the Webb & Allen shipyard in Manhattan, now located between Fifth and Seventh Streets on the East River. She was built of wood, 269 feet (82 m) long and 40 feet (12 m) wide, with a fully loaded draft of 13 feet 8 inches (4.17 m). She had three decks and weighed 2,067 tons. The Golden Gate could carry 1,200 passengers, and had 1,500 lifejackets, lifeboats, and three fire hydrants. The hydrants were to prove inadequate when put to the test.

The ship had three masts that could carry sails, but her main propulsion was from side paddle wheels 33 feet 6 inches (10.21 m) in diameter. The wheels were powered by two oscillating engines from Novelty Iron Works. The engines had a compressor that raised their pressure to 30 pounds per square inch (210 kPa). The total cost of construction was $483,000. The SS Illinois, serving the US mail service, was her twin.

== Service ==
The Pacific Mail Steamship Company provided a regular mail service between San Francisco and New York that took about five weeks. Twice a month a steamer sailed from San Francisco to Panama City, while another sailed from New York to Chagres (Colón) on the other side of the isthmus of Panama. Passengers would cross the isthmus, a three day journey by canoe and mule, then take the waiting steamer to their destination. The Pacific Mail Steamship Company had half a dozen boats on the West Coast that served the San Francisco–Panama route. Fares for the one-way trips were $250 for first class, $175 for second class and $100 for steerage.

The Golden Gate left New York in August or September 1851 and sailed via Rio de Janeiro and Valparaíso to Panama. It began its maiden voyage as a passenger ship from Panama in October 1851. It reached San Francisco on 19 November 1851. In the first four years on the San Francisco–Panama route, from 1851 to 1855, the Golden Gate averaged a speed of 12 knots. She once made a trip of 11 days and four hours, a record that stood until 1855. At top speed she burned 6 tons of coal daily, but usually ran slower and used less coal.

The Golden Gate was thought to be one of the safest and most dependable of steamers in the region. However, it seems that fires had begun in the kitchen before but had been put out. There were other problems. 29 people on board died of cholera in 1852. On 2 September that year she was seized for carrying too many passengers. She grounded at Point Loma in 1854.

== Last voyage ==
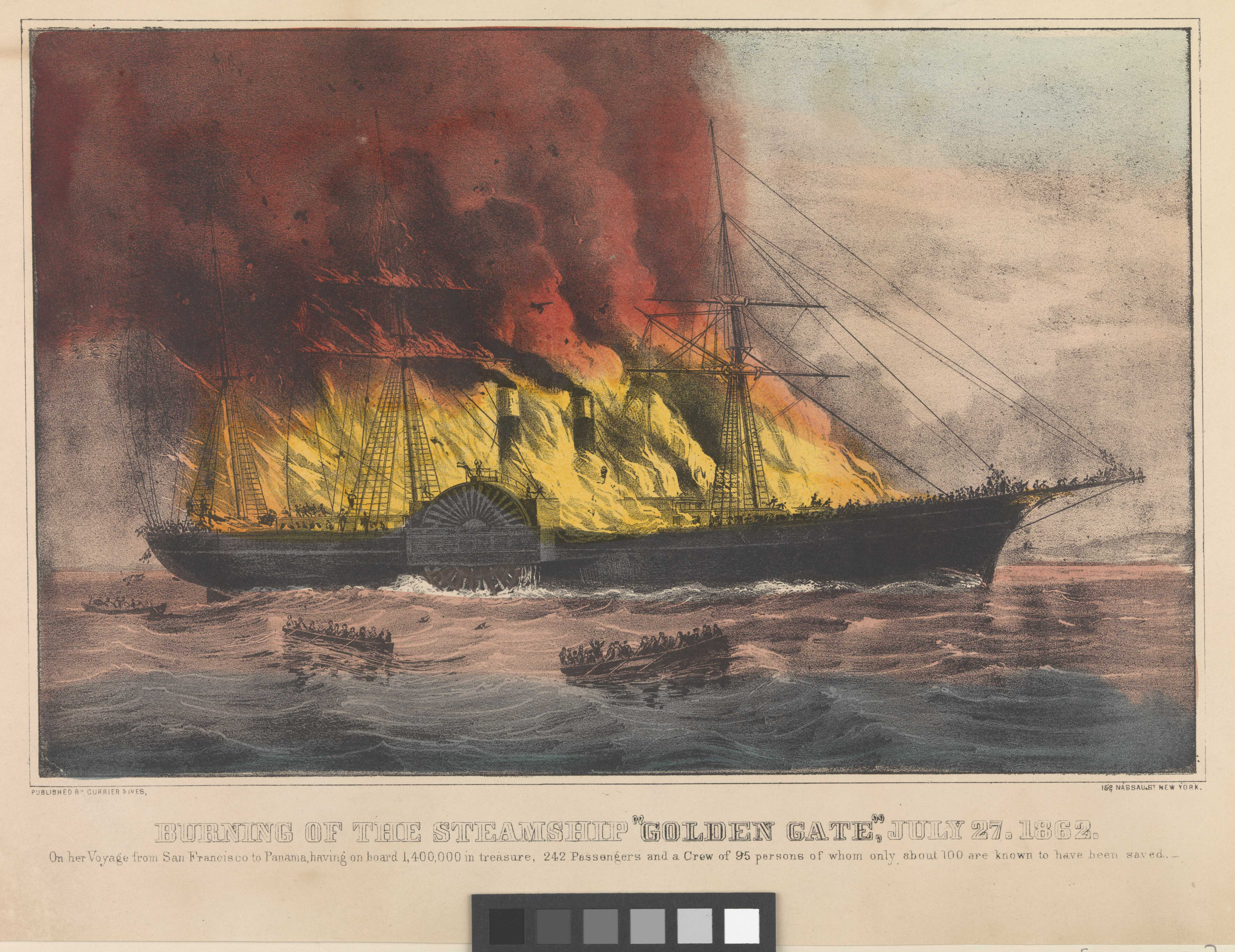
Golden Gate burning, lifeboats in foregound. Hand-colored lithograph from c. 1863

The fire that destroyed the Golden Gate occurred during the American Civil War. The ship left San Francisco at 2:30 pm on Monday, 21 July 1862 under Captain W. H. Hudson, with Captain R. H. Pearson as a passenger. She had a crew of 96 and was carrying 242 passengers, on whom 95 were in cabin class. She carried US$1,400,000 in $50 gold coins for Wells Fargo, a huge amount at the time. Many of the passengers were also carrying gold or had deposited gold with the purser.

The sea was calm and the ship was a few miles off the coast about 14 miles (23 km) from Manzanillo on the evening of Sunday 27 July 1862 when the fire broke out. It started about 4:45 pm in the floor between the kitchen and the engine room. Captain Hudson decided to run for shore while Pearson supervised firefighting. As the fire intensified the steerage passengers were trapped, and the wind and motion pushed the flames to the rear. Pearson broke down a bulkhead to rescue the chief engineer W. Waddell and crewmen from the engine room. Boats were launched when the Golden Gate was still around 2 miles (3.2 km) from shore. The Daily Alta California reported,

The first mate then ordered one of the boats to go back and taken the surplus boats in tow, and follow in the wake of the ship, which was headed for the shore, ... All the after part of the ship was now one sheet of flame, and her passengers were all crowded into the bow. By the time we had reached the ship, many were ashore. After rowing about the ship until we could find no more floating there, we then went back, still searching for those who had left the ship before she struck, and found some five or six who were floating upon boards and timbers, among whom were Ben Hollday and Mr. Storms.

Many passengers had to jump overboard, and many were unable to reach a boat or swim to shore. It was said that some of the passengers wore belts holding gold and silver coins, but had to discard them in the water so they would not be pulled down by the weight. The ship ran aground by 5:30 pm about 300 yards (270 m) from shore in heavy surf on the beach now called Playa de Oro (Gold Beach).

According to The New York Times of 9 August 1862, the ship carried 242 passengers and 95 officers and crew. 74 passengers survived, 21 from the first cabin, 22 from the second cabin and 31 from steerage. Of the officers and crew, survivors were W. H. Hudson, Captain; W. Waddell, Chief Engineer; Mathew Nolan, First Mate; H. McKinney, Second Mate; J. K. Wood, Purser; and 58 others. The survivors dug graves for the corpses that washed ashore, with wooden crosses to identify the victims. Most of the survivors were picked up on 29 July 1862 by the steamer St Louis, which took them back to San Francisco. Most survivors reached San Francisco in August. The Daily Alta published their reports and those of captains Hudson and Pearson.

== Salvage ==
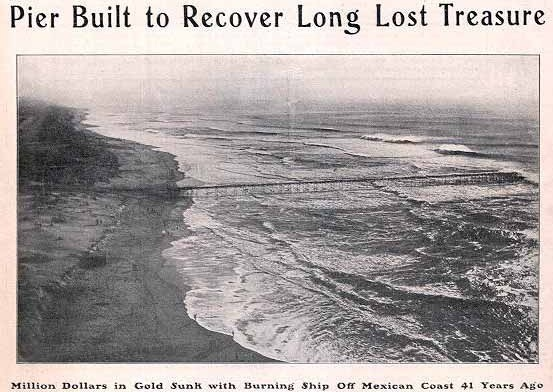
1903 pier built during salvage effort

The Mazatlan Cosmopolitan (Note: The Mazatlan Cosmopolitan; El Cosmopolita de Mazatlán was a short-lived bilingual (English/Spanish) newspaper published between 1862 and 1863 by the American A.D. Jones. It was replaced on 12 May 1863 by the English-only Mazatlan Times.) reported on 1 January 1863.

From the Wreck of the Golden Gate: The pilot boat Potter, of San Francisco, arrived here on Sunday last from Manzanillo, having recently visited the wreck of the steamship Golden Gate, T. J. L. Smiley, of San Francisco, who was one of the party accompanying the pilot boat on her expedition to the wrecked steamer, has given us some interesting particulars of the excursion. Mr. Smiley says portions of the wreck are still visible, but from observations made around and about it, he is of opinion that the sides of the vessel must have given way since the wreck, and that the treasure aboard the ill-fated steamer has drifted out, and been buried in the sand. The New York and foreign underwriters had been to the wreck endeavoring to obtain the treasure, but had abandoned the enterprise before the Potter reached the ground.

On 8 February 1863 the Daily Alta reported that the steamship Constitution had taken on board fifteen boxes holding $820,000 that had been recovered by William Irelan during a spell of calm weather. He and a party of ten assistants had anchored a scow over the wreck. An engine was used to dredge up sand and other materials to expose the wreck. A steam pump and hose was used to clean off sand from the submerged boxes. A diver attached ropes to each box, and they were hoisted aboard the scow by machinery. The newspaper was optimistic that all the treasure would be recovered in the next two months. However, some had been stolen by a gang of Mexicans. In the end most of the gold was recovered and returned to Wells Fargo in 1863.

The wreck itself was covered by drifting sand. A contractor from Boston named C.W. Johnson visited the site forty years later and decided to attempt salvage. He built a pier to provide a platform for dredging equipment to avoid the problems of difficult currents, surf and winds. He claimed in an article in Popular Mechanics in May 1903 that he had recovered $1,000,000. Soon afterwards, the pier was destroyed by a hurricane, although many of the pumps and other equipment were recovered. An unsuccessful attempt was made in 1931–1932 by the engineer Charles Pouliot. It is said by the local people that a man called Veralman found gold in the 1960s and built the Posada Hotel with the money.

The safe in the purser's office was finally located in 2003 under 9 feet (2.7 m) of sand by CEDAM, Conservation, Ecology, Diving, Archaeology and Museums. The beach is still being searched for gold by enthusiasts with metal detectors.

== Sources ==
- Czernek, Andrew (2018), Salvage of the S.S. Golden Gate
- D. Blethen Adams Levy (1998–2018), "San Francisco Sank Enroute SS Golden Gate", The Maritime Heritage Project ~ San Francisco 1800-1899
- Lerma Garay, Antonio (5 August 2016), "The Mazatlan Cosmopolitan", Globedia
- Marshall, Suzanne A. (1 January 2017), "The Ship S.S. Golden Gate", Manzanillo Sun
- Martínez de la Rosa, Armando (2006), "The Shipwrecking of the "SS. Golden Gate, a Golden Legend", in Jose Luis Ezquerra de la Colina (ed.), History and future of the tourist and port development of the coast in Manzanillo, Colima, UCOL, ISBN 9789706922670
- Sovil, Terry, "Manzanillo Mexico S S Golden Gate Shipwreck", Aquatic Sports and Adventures
- Tiemann, Jonathan (July 2018), Contagion 1855: How the Crimean War Felled San Francisco's Largest Banks (PDF), Tiemann Investment Advisors LLC
