= USS Oregon =

Four ships of the United States Navy have been named USS Oregon, in honor of the Oregon Territory or the 33rd state.

- The first USS Oregon (1841) was a brig purchased in 1841 to support the U.S. Exploring Expedition and in commission until 1845.
- A never-launched monitor previously named Quinsigamond and Hercules was also called Oregon before she was broken up in the ways.
- The third USS Oregon (BB-3) was a battleship that saw action in the Spanish–American War and was in commission from 1896 to 1919.
- The fourth USS Oregon (SSN-793) is a Virginia-class submarine

== Confederate States Navy ==
- One ship of the Confederate States Navy also bore the name Oregon. See CSS Oregon.

== See also ==
- SS Oregon
- USS Oregon City
- USS Oregonian
- SS Beaver State (T-ACS-10)
