= George Law (financier) =

American financier

- Born: October 25, 1806; Jackson, Washington County, New York
- Died: November 18, 1881 (aged 75); New York City, New York
- Other name: "Live-Oak George"
- Political party: Know-Nothing
- Relatives: Henry Marshall (nephew)

George Law (October 25, 1806 – November 18, 1881) was an American entrepreneur and failed presidential candidate for the American Party in the 1856 United States presidential election from New York.

== Early life ==
His only early education was winter night school. At the age of eighteen, he left his father's farm and after walking to Troy, he learned the trades of masonry and stonemasonry in Hoosic. He was employed with the Delaware and Hudson Canal in 1825, then superintended the making of canal-locks at High Falls. Afterward he went to the mountains of Pennsylvania to quarry stone for locks and was employed as a mechanic on canals. In June 1829, he was awarded a contract for a small lock and aqueduct on the Delaware and Hudson Canal. Self-taught, he studied and made himself a good engineer and draughtsman and became a large contractor for the construction of railroads and canals.

== Investments in railroads and shipping ==
In August 1837, one of his brothers was engaged in the construction of the Croton waterworks. He went to New York city, where he was awarded contracts for sections of the aqueduct. In 1839 he was awarded the contract for the High Bridge, by which it crosses Harlem River. In 1842 he took on the management of the Dry Dock bank. Later he purchased and extended the New York and Harlem Railroad and Mohawk Railroad. He bought the steamer SS Neptune in 1843, then built the SS Oregon in 1845. With Marshall O. Roberts and Bowes R. McIlvaine he formed the U.S. Mail Steamship Company and assumed the contract to carry the US mails to California. The company built the SS Ohio and the SS Georgia and with the purchased SS Falcon in early 1849 carried the first passengers by steamship to Chagres, on the east coast of the Isthmus of Panama. Soon the rapid transit time the steamship lines and the trans isthmus passage made possible when the California Gold Rush began made it a profitable company. That same year Law completed the High Bridge.

When the Pacific Mail Steamship Company established a competing line between New York and Chagres, George Law placed on the Pacific his own competing line of four steamships – SS Antelope, SS Columbus, SS Isthmus and SS Republic. In April 1851, the rivalry was ended when he purchased their steamers on the Atlantic side and sold his new Pacific Line and its ships on the Panama City to San Francisco run. Impressed by the returns from the short amount of line of William Henry Aspinwall's Panama Railway, he acquired a large interest in the project in 1852. He went to the isthmus to examine the route and located the terminus at Aspinwall, where he began to build the railroad depot next to the steamship wharf. Aspinwall soon became the destination of the Panama steamships once the railroad was finished.

Meanwhile, in New York he purchased the franchise of the Eighth Avenue street-railroad in New York. He sold his interest in the Panama Railroad in the winter of 1853. He then built the Ninth Avenue Railroad and purchased the steam ferry to Staten Island, and the Grand and Roosevelt Street ferries between New York and Brooklyn.

== Crescent City and presidential politics ==
In 1852 George Law had a quarrel with Captain Valentín Cañedo y Miranda, the Spanish Captain General of Cuba, which brought him prominent public notice. Cañedo was offended because Purser Smith, the purser of one of Law's vessels, had published statements in US publications critical of the colonial Cuban government. He was further offended by the anti-Cuban remarks of Admiral David Porter. The Spanish government refused entrance to any vessel with Purser Smith or Admiral David Porter aboard. The US government did not support George Law in his determination to send the SS Crescent City to Havana with the purser on board; when Law persisted, the US government withdrew the mail. In fact, Fillmore wrote to Cañedo to request that he rescind his ban and presented Cañedo with an affidavit exonerating Smith. Cañedo withdrew the ban at Fillmore's request. Law dispatched the steamship and Captain-general Cañedo failed to fire her. In several public letters, Law attacked both the Fillmore and the Pierce administrations for cowardice.

Law was then nicknamed "Live-Oak George", coined by the workmen in his shipyard because of Law's insistence on building ships with the best materials; for critical parts of hull construction, including the braces that supported the decks, the preferred material was live oak wood.

Law was recognized by some for his stand against government inactivity in the face of a threat to a U. S. citizen, and was nominated as the Native American Party or Know-Nothing candidate for President of the United States in February 1855 by the Pennsylvania Legislature, but Millard Fillmore, one of the U.S. Presidents whom Law had attacked, was chosen as that party's candidate for the 1856 Election.

The U.S. Mail Steamship Company only operated for 11 years. Upon the mail contract and subsidy's expiration in 1859 the company withdrew from the business and sold its ships.

Law had a steamship named after him. The SS George Law was later renamed SS Central America. She sank in a three-day and night hurricane carrying most of her passengers, gold bullion then valued at US$2,000,000 and Commander William Lewis Herndon down with her. The sinking of the ship with the loss of so much gold contributed to the Panic of 1857.

State Senator Henry Marshall (1847–1938) was his nephew.
