= Oregon, Tennessee =

Coordinates: 35.969229°N 86.212768°W

Oregon is a ghost town in Wilson County, in the U.S. state of Tennessee.

== History ==
The community was named after the territory of Oregon.
