= U.S. Mail Steamship Company =

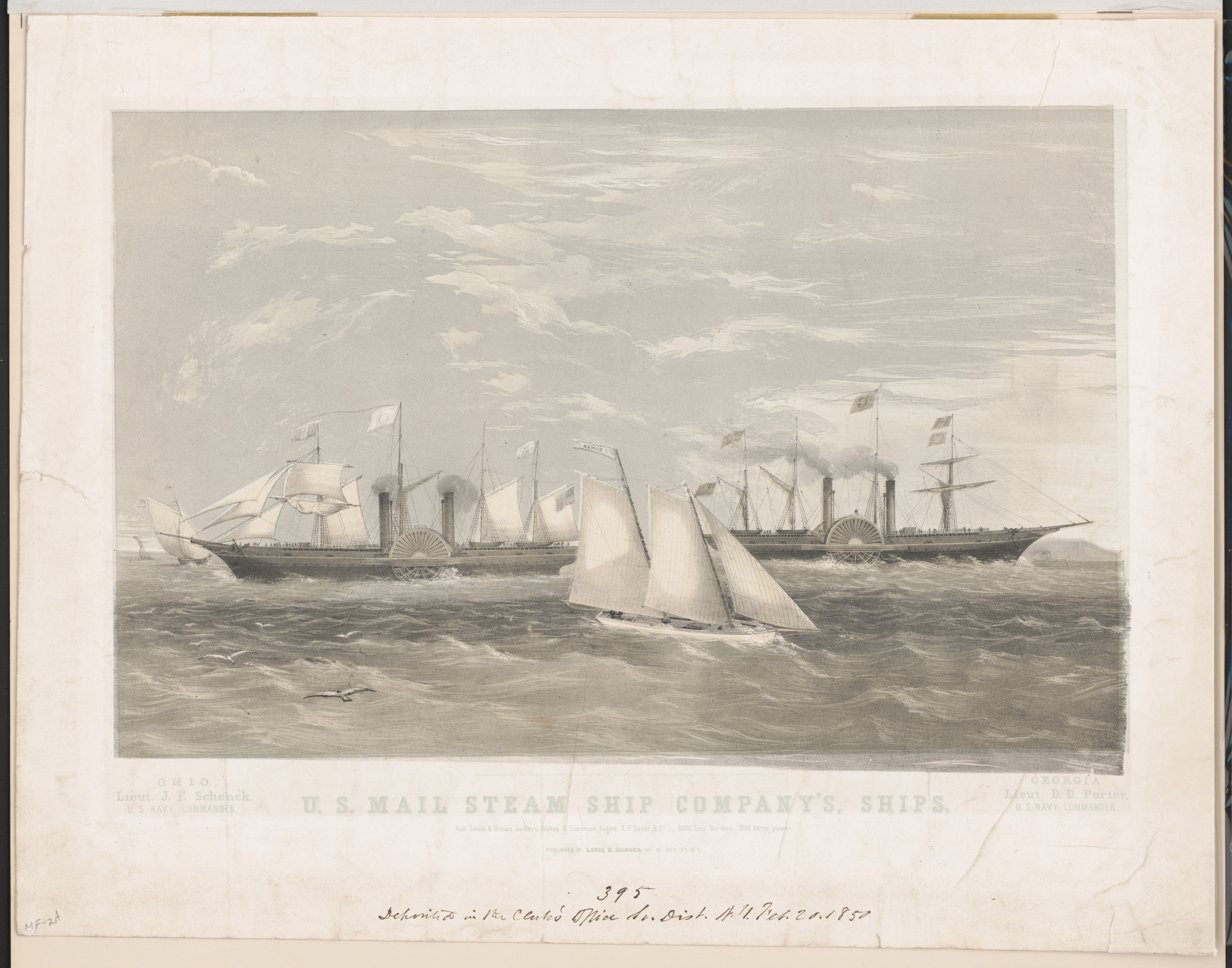
U.S. Mail Steamship's Ohio and Georgia

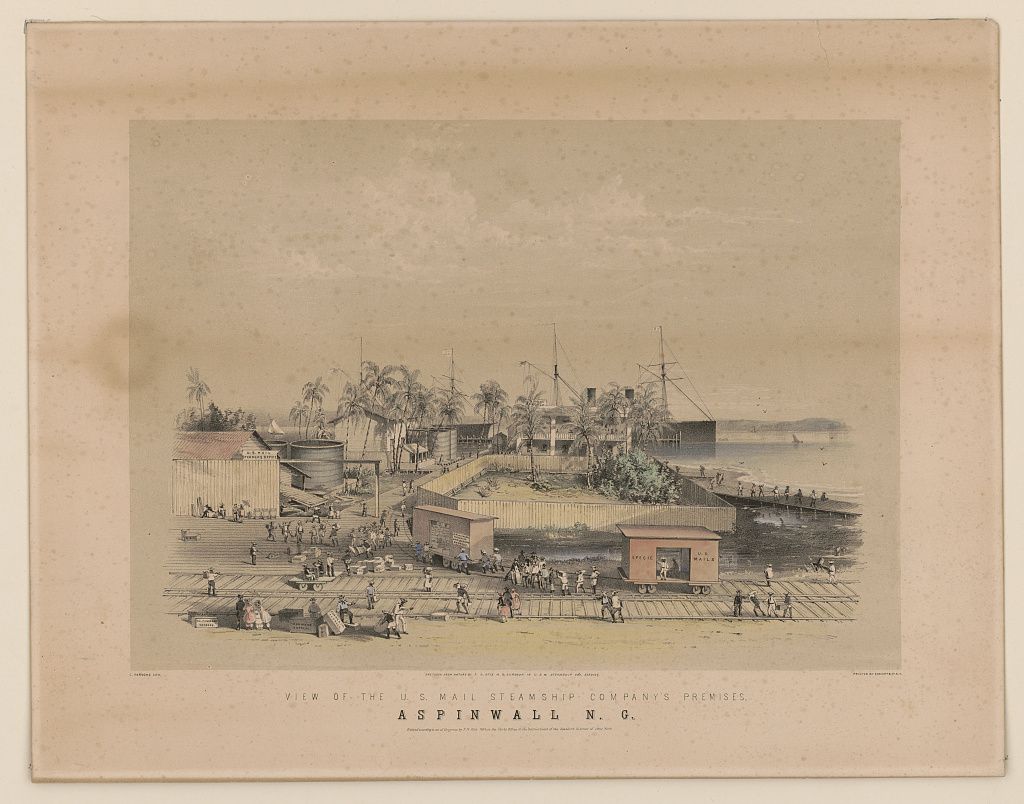
View of the U.S. mail steamship company's premises, at Aspinwall, N.G.

U.S. Mail Steamship Company was a company formed in 1848 by George Law, Marshall Owen Roberts and Bowes R. McIlvaine to assume the contract to carry the U. S. mails from New York City, with stops in New Orleans and Havana, to the Isthmus of Panama for delivery in California. The company had the SS Ohio and the SS Georgia built in 1848, and with the purchased SS Falcon in early 1849 carried the first passengers by steamship to Chagres, on the east coast of the Isthmus of Panama. Soon the rapid transit time the steamship lines and the trans isthmus passage made possible when the California Gold Rush began made it a very profitable company.

When in 1850 the Pacific Mail Steamship Company established a competing line to the U.S. Mail Steamship Company between New York City and Chagres, George Law placed an opposition Pacific Line of steamers (SS Antelope, SS Columbus, SS Isthumus, SS Republic) in the Pacific running from Panama to San Francisco. In April, 1851, the rivalry was ended when an agreement was made between the companies, the U.S. Mail Steamship Company purchased the Pacific Mail steamers on the Atlantic side (SS Crescent City, SS Empire City, SS Philadelphia), and George Law sold his ships and new line to the Pacific Mail. Law went into partnership with William Henry Aspinwall to develop the Panama Railroad in 1852.

In 1852, George Law had a dispute with the Cuban Captain-general. The Spanish official was incensed because the purser of one of Law's vessels had published an insulting statement in a New York newspaper, and he refused entrance to any vessel having the purser on board. The American government refused to sustain Mr. Law in his determination to send the Crescent City to Havana with the purser on board, and withdrew the mail when he persisted. He nevertheless despatched the steamship, and the Captain-general failed to carry out his threat to fire on her.

The U.S. Mail Steamship Company only operated for 11 years. On the expiration of the mail contract in 1859 the company withdrew from the business. Its directors were said to be more interested in immediate financial returns than in providing a good service, so there was little public regret at its passing.

== Ships of the U.S. Mail Steamship Company ==
- SS Falcon 1848–1852 Purchased by the company, she started New York to Chagres service on December 1, 1848 and continued until 1852. She also ran New Orleans to Havana to Chagres.
- SS Ohio 1848–1854 Built for the company, it served from September 20, 1849 sailing from New York to Charleston, Savannah, Havana, New Orleans and Chagres until it was withdrawn from service in spring 1854.
- SS Georgia 1848–1854 Built for the company, served on the New York to Chagres service from January 28, 1850 until February, 1854.
- SS Pacific 1850–1851 Built for the company, served on the New York to Chagres service from 1850 until March 19, 1851 when it sailed from New York for San Francisco and arrived 2 July. There she was purchased by Cornelius Vanderbilt for the San Francisco to Panama service.
- SS Philadelphia 1851–1859 Purchased by the company, in January, 1851, she was lengthened and used on the New Orleans to Chagres run until 1860.
- SS Crescent City 1851–1856 Purchased from the Pacific Mail Steamship Company and continued regular New York to Chagres voyages until summer 1852. She made a single voyage on this service in 1853 and was wrecked on a reef in the Gulf of Mexico in 1856.
- SS Empire City 1851–1856 Purchased from the Pacific Mail Steamship Company and continued on the New York to Chagres service until 1856.
- SS Illinois 1851–1859 Built for the company, it served on the New York to Chagres service from August 26, 1851 until early 1859.
- SS George Law 1852–1857 Built for the company, it served on the New York to Aspinwall service from October 20, 1853. It was renamed the SS Central America in 1857. On the return run between Havana and New York, she sank at sea on September 12, 1857 in a hurricane with the loss of about 423 lives and eight million dollars in gold.
- SS St. Louis 1855–1859 Sold to the company by the New York & Havre Steam Navigation Company in August 1855, she made occasional voyages between New York and Aspinwall from 1855 until 1859. Purchased by the Pacific Mail Steamship Company.
- SS North Star 1854–1855 Formerly used as private yacht by Cornelius Vanderbilt and used on his New York to Aspinwall service she performed same service for the U.S. Mail company from September 1854 until January 1855 when it was returned to Vanderbilt.
- SS Cherokee 1855 Purchased by the company.
- SS Northern Light 1857 Belonged to Vanderbilt, but in September 1857 she went onto the New York to Aspinwall service for the U.S. Mail Steamship Company until December, 1857 when she went back to Vanderbilt's service.
- SS Granada 1857–1859 Served the company from 1857 on the New York to Aspinwall service until spring 1859.
- SS Moses Taylor 1858–1859 Built for the company, she served on the New York to Aspinwall service from January 5, 1858 until September 1859.
- SS Star of the West 1857–1859 A Vanderbilt ship, she started the New York to Aspinwall service for the company from June, 1857 until September, 1859
- SS Central America Sank 1857

== Sources ==
- Appleton's Cyclopedia of American Biography, Vol. III, (1892) p. 636, out of copyright.
- Case of the Black Warrior: and other violations of the rights of American citizens by Spanish authorities, United States. Dept. of State, B. Tucker, Senate printer, 1854
- TheShipsList website: United States Mail Line of 1848–1859
- TheShipsList website: Steamships on the Panama Route – Both Atlantic and Pacific
- The White-Collar Route to El Dorado, The Era of the Clipper Ships website
- "The Panama Railroad", The Era of the Clipper Ships website
- "The Panama Route 1848-1851"; The Postal Gazette, November 2006
