= José Martín Barrundia y Flores =

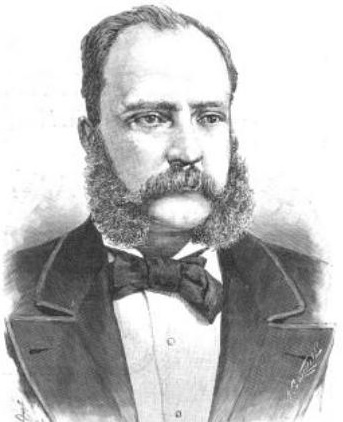
- General Barrundia Flores. Image from La Ilustración Española y Americana

Secretary of War of Guatemala
- In office 1 March 1879 – 2 April 1885
- President: Justo Rufino Barrios

Personal details
- Born: December 17, 1845 Guatemala City, Guatemala
- Died: August 28, 1890 (aged 44) Puerto San José, Guatemala
- Spouse: Tránsito Hurtarte
- Children: María de la Luz, Teresa Mercedes, Ana María, Victoria Antonia, Dolores, and Octavia Barrundia Hurtarte
- Parent(s): José Francisco Barrundia (Note: Nombre completo: José Francisco María Pedro Regalado Juan Nepomuceno Barrundia Cepeda); Antonia Flores de Barrundia
- Profession: Army General

José Martín Barrundia y Flores (17 December 1845 – 28 August 1890) was a Guatemalan military officer and liberal politician. He was the son of the influential liberal leader José Francisco Barrundia. Barrundia was appointed as Secretary of War during the constitutional presidential term of general Justo Rufino Barrios, until the violent death of Barrios, on 2 April 1885. After the president's death, Barrundia was hoping to reach the presidency, but was outsmarted by general Manuel Lisandro Barillas, governor of Quetzaltenango who became president instead.

After going into exile to Mexico, Barrundia kept attacking Barilla's regime which was used against him as he was blamed as the culprit for all the mistakes and abuses that took place during the deceased president Justo Rufino Barrios. Barrundia died in August 1890 when the Guatemalan police attempted to capture him on board of the SS Acapulco, which was docked at Puerto San José.

== Biography ==
=== Secretary of War ===
In his newspaper article La Penitenciaria de Guatemala (English: The Guatemalan Penitentiary), the British-Guatemalan writer Guillermo F. Hall described one of the prisoners who was in charge of punishing his fellow captives in the Penitentiary during Justo Rufino Barrios regime: "Tata Juan" was the oldest prisoner in the prison, being inside since it had opened its door. He had been a minion of Rufino Barrios and Barrundia. It was his favorite topic to talk to his admirers about the crimes he had committed, either on his own or by orders of the president and the Secretary of War . [...] He would brag about killing twenty six men on his own; he did not recall how many others had died from his punishment in the cells by orders from Barrundia and Barrios- there were so many! He would tell [...] how he would fulfill his masters requests; how after hitting someone 200 or 300 times would take a nap lulled with the groaning of his victim [to later continue] the task with renewed vigor, destroying their eyes so they would not "complain as much".

=== Death of General Barrios ===
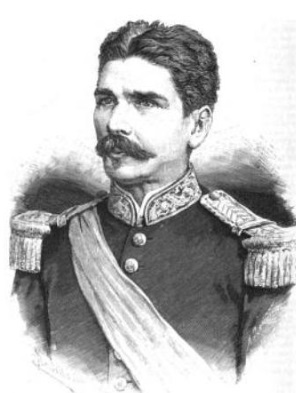
Manuel Lisandro Barillas, President of Guatemala from 1885 to 1892. Image from La Ilustración Española y Americana

After President General Justo Rufino Barrios died in the battle of Chalchuapa on 2 April 1885, the first presidential designate, Alejandro M. Sinibaldi Castro, took over as Interim President, ratified by Barrios cabinet members. However, under Barrundia's pressure, Sinibaldi resigned on 6 April 1885.

After President Sinibaldi Castro's resignation, the Guatemalan Assembly named the second presidential designate as interim President. This person was General Manuel Lisandro Barillas Bercián, who arrived in Guatemala City when General Barrios was being put to rest and demanded of General Barrundia — Secretary of War and main candidate for the presidency after Sinibaldi's resignation — that he be appointed president, and that he needed room and board for the thousands of troops that he had brought along and were waiting on the outskirts of the city. Barillas was governor of Quetzaltenango. The troops did not exist, but Barrundia did not know that and by the time he realized he had been taken, Barillas had been sworn as interim President.

=== Leaving Guatemala for Mexico ===
Barrundia realized his mistake and had to leave Guatemala and move to Mexico when he was accused of embezzling large amounts of government money and threatened to face justice for the illegal tortures that allegedly took place by his orders.

He went to Mexico, where he printed several pamphlets aimed as Barillas, which was used by the Guatemalan liberals to blame him for all the wrongdoing that occurred under president Barrios, while the latter's persona was idealized. For example, here is how liberal writer Joaquín Méndez describes both of them:

His last paper bring along only outbursts of his badly hurt vanity, and expresses that he is exasperated by his absolute political impotence, because he wants to show himself as a severe republican and incorruptible democrat, the same man that here did not respect honor, life, property, age or gender, and he is responsible of almost all the bad excesses that took place during general Barrios' presidency, while he cannot claim to even the smallest portion of the merits of the transcendental progress accomplished by the Great Reformer of Guatemala.

— Joaquín Méndez, Otra vez, don J. Martín Barrundia, 1890

Towards the end of 1888, Barrundia tried to return to Guatemala, but the public opinion was so agitated against him, that he could not reach Guatemala City and was forced to return to Mexico and there was public outrage in every town that he encountered.

Then, in March 1890, he prepared an invasion from the Mexican border, but as soon as this became known, the Guatemalan Minister of Foreign Relations went to the Legation of Mexico, to call the attention of that Government to the matter; the Mexican authorities thwarted Barrundia's plan as they seized the arms and munitions of war which he proposed to transport into Guatemala.

== Death ==
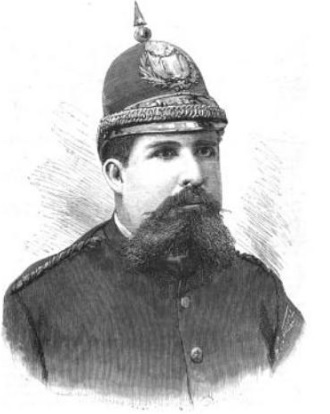
Carlos Ezeta, president of El Salvador from 1890 to 1894. Image from La Ilustración Española y Americana

After the coup led by Salvadorian general Carlos Ezeta against president Francisco Menéndez Valdivieso, first presidential designate, Camilo Alvarez, and a number of enemies of the new government fled to Guatemala and asked president Barillas' help to stop Ezeta, claiming that he attempted to invade Guatemala; however, their real intention was to recover power in their country using the Guatemalan army to accomplish that. But Barillas, convinced by the rumors, moved his troops to the border and put some of them under the command of Álvarez. After a few skirmishes the troops stopped advancing on either side and the war stopped altogether on 21 August 1890. Sarcastically, Guatemalans called this the Totoposte War as it was only useful to move troops and corn supplies (Totoposte) to the Salvadorian border, with heavy impact for the country's economy.

Nevertheless, during this war died general Barrundia, while trying to join the Ezetas in El Salvador. He had boarded the American steamboat SS Acapulco in Acapulco, Mexico; however, upon learning this, the Guatemalan Government, based on International Law, detained the ship in Puerto San José and demanded that the passengers be handed over. Barrundia resisted arrest, and was killed by the policemen that were supposed to capture him.

Events that led to Juan Martín Barrundia death
Date	Description
22 June 1890	Military coup in San Salvador led by Carlos Ezeta, against Menéndez government.
20 July 1890	After the Candelaria battle, general Camilo Alvarez, with what was left of his troops retreated to Atescatempa, where there was a small Guatemalan garrison led by a colonel Garza. However, at 3:00 pm, general Villavicencio with fresh Salvadorian troops led by Antonio Ezeta came into Atescatempa and easily claimed it.
26 July 1890	Calling Barrundia: From Santa Ana, El Salvador, general Carlos Ezeta sent the following telegram to Barrundia who was in Tapachula: Do not delay. Our troops are advancing from victory to victory. The capital of Guatemala is almost in complete anarchy. Hurry up!»
Barrundia attempts a second invasion to Guatemala. He moved from Tapachula to Tacaná, San Marcos but was captured by Mexican authorities.
3 August 1890	Tempisque military action (Totoposte War): Guatemalan troops from Santa Rosa, Alta Verapaz and Jutiapa, came under fire from Salvadorian and Guatemalan exiles troops. General Pedro Barillas ordered immediate retreat and reached favorable positions from where he repelled the attack.
21 August 1890	The Guatemalan Department of Foreign Affairs was aware of every single move that Barrundia was making, and therefore on 21 August issued its orders to the Guatemalan harbors of Ocós, Champerico, San José and Livingston, Izabal to go ahead and capture Barrundia, not before sending a note to the United States Consulate notifying them that Barrundia had committed high treason and had to be sent to prison.
28 August 1890	Guatemalan authorities attempt to capture Barrundia aboard SS Acapulco, but killed him when he attempted to resist arrest by firing at his to-be-captors.

=== Compensation request to the United States government ===
In March 1891, his widow Tránsito Hurtarte, on her behalf and that of his six orphan daughters, and his brother in law Ramón Bengoechea, on behalf of his sister Teresa, presented before the Department of State a request for one million dollars in compensation for the death of Barrundia on board of the American SS Acapulco. However, the US government dismissed the case on the grounds that the request had been made by foreign citizens without the support of their government.
