= Oregon, Maryland =

Unincorporated community in Maryland, United States

- Unincorporated community
- Location within the State of Maryland Oregon, Maryland (the United States)
- Coordinates: 39°29′50″N 76°41′11″W
- Country: United States
- State: Maryland
- County: Baltimore
- Elevation: 367 ft (112 m)
- Time zone: UTC-5 (Eastern (EST))
  - Summer (DST): UTC-4 (EDT)
- GNIS feature ID: 590952

Oregon is an unincorporated community in Baltimore County, in the U.S. state of Maryland.

== History ==
A post office called Oregon was established in 1879, and remained in operation until 1902. The community was named after the state of Oregon.
