= SS Oregon =

SS Oregon may refer to the following steamships:

- SS Oregon (1845) built for George Law.
- SS Oregon (1848) launched on 5 August 1848 by Smith & Dimon, New York for the Pacific Mail Steamship Company.
- SS Oregon (1878) built in Chester, Pennsylvania, once operated by the Oregon Railroad and Navigation Company and wrecked off Alaska in 1906 without any loss of life
- SS Oregon (1882), Dominion Line, brought the first Ukrainian immigrants Ivan Pylypow and Wasyl Eleniak to Canada, scrapped in Genoa in 1897
- SS Oregon (1883), British passenger liner, sank 1886 (33 km) east of Long Island, New York
- SS Oregon (1919), built as SS Quabbin; American-flagged tanker sunk by U-156 on 28 February 1942
- SS Oregon (1920), built as SS Anna E. Morse; British-flagged cargo ship damaged by U-660 on 10 August 1942 and sunk by U-438 later the same day
- SS Oregon (1961), a former name for the training ship Empire State VI of the State University of New York Maritime College

== See also ==
- USS Oregon
- SS Oregonian
- MS Oregon (1940), a Type C1-B ship; launched 29 November 1940 by the Seattle-Tacoma Shipbuilding Corporation, sank in a collision on 10 December 1941
