= List of islands of California =

This list of islands of California is organized into sections, generally arranged from north to south. The islands within each section are listed in alphabetical order.

The Geographic Names Information System (GNIS) lists 527 named islands in the state.

== Humboldt County ==
=== Offshore ===
Island	Image	Coordinates	Description
Sugar Loaf Island		40.438767°N 124.413783°W	Sugar Loaf Island, offshore Cape Mendocino, rises 128 feet (39 m) above mean sea level. It is a special zone in the South Cape Mendocino State Marine Reserve and is closed to public access. Being offshore of Cape Mendocino, the westernmost point in California, Sugar Loaf Island is called the westernmost island in the state.

=== Humboldt Bay ===
All three islands in Humboldt Bay are located in the narrow midsection of the bay. This portion of the bay is located within the City of Eureka, California entirely within Humboldt County.

Island	Image	Coordinates	Description
Daby Island		40.8114°N 124.151837°W	The smallest of the three islands within Humboldt Bay, Daby Island has a maximum elevation of 3 feet (0.91 m) and is located slightly northeast of Woodley Island.
Tuluwat Island		40°48′46″N 124°10′06″W	The largest island, 1.3 miles (2.1 km) long, was originally the center of culture and population of the indigenous Wiyot people. Now protected, no public access is allowed, except for the Wiyot and grandfathered residents.
Woodley Island		40.809516°N 124.160549°W	The second largest of the three islands within Humboldt Bay contains: the Woodley Island Marina (Eureka's largest marina), the Eureka regional office of the National Weather Service, and offices of the Humboldt Bay Harbor Recreation & Conservation District.

== San Francisco Bay Area ==
Island	Image	Coordinates	Counties	Description
Alameda Island		37°45′55″N 122°14′30″W	Alameda, San Francisco (small, uninhabited sliver)	This 6-mile (9.7 km) long island in San Francisco Bay is the main part of the City of Alameda.
Alcatraz Island		37°49′36″N 122°25′24″W	San Francisco	This 22-acre (8.9 ha) island in San Francisco Bay once served as a lighthouse, a military fortification, a military prison, and as a federal prison until 1963. It is now part of the Golden Gate National Recreation Area.
Angel Island		37°51′46″N 122°25′51″W	Marin, San Francisco (small, uninhabited slivers)	With an area of 1.2 square miles (3.1 km^{2}), this island in San Francisco Bay processed approximately 1 million immigrants to the U.S. during 1910 to 1940. It is currently a state park.
Año Nuevo Island		37°06′31″N 122°20′16″W	San Mateo	Small Pacific island, about 0.2 miles (0.32 km) long, near Año Nuevo (New Year's) Point, south of the Golden Gate. It is protected by the Año Nuevo State Reserve as an important habitat for seabirds and other coastal wildlife.
Bair Island		37°31′48″N 122°13′20″W	San Mateo	This 2,600-acre (1,100 ha) island in San Francisco Bay near Redwood City is part of the Don Edwards San Francisco Bay National Wildlife Refuge.
Bay Farm Island		37°44′17″N 122°15′07″W	Alameda	This former island in San Francisco Bay has been connected to the mainland. It is part of the City of Alameda.
Belvedere Island		37°52′18″N 122°28′07″W	Marin	This former island in Richardson Bay has been connected to the mainland. It is part of the City of Belvedere.
Bird Island		37°49′27″N 122°32′12″W	Marin	Small Pacific island between Point Bonita and Rodeo Cove.
Bird Rock		38°13′48″N 122°59′40″W	Marin	Small Pacific island west of Tomales Point, primarily a seabird colony. It covers 2 acres (0.81 ha).
Brewer Island		37°33′30″N 122°14′59″W	San Mateo	Coterminous with Foster City.
Brooks Island		37°53′47″N 122°21′19″W	Contra Costa	A 65-acre (26 ha) island in San Francisco Bay south of Richmond, protected as part of the Brooks Island Regional Shoreline.
The Brothers		37°57′48″N 122°25′59″W	Contra Costa	Two small islands, East Brother and West Brother, located west of Point San Pablo. Each is about 300 feet (91 m) long. East Brother has a lighthouse and a bed and breakfast.
Castro Rocks		37°55′56″N 122°25′07″W	Contra Costa	Beneath the Richmond–San Rafael Bridge.
Coast Guard Island		37°46′56″N 122°15′00″W	Alameda	Located in the Oakland Estuary, this 67-acre (27 ha) artificial island is part of the City of Alameda. It is home to various United States Coast Guard facilities.
Corinthian Island		37°52′22″N 122°27′32″W	Marin	This former island was joined to the mainland in the 1980s. It is split between the city of Belvedere and the town of Tiburon.
Dolphin Isle		37°33′41″N 122°15′19″W	San Mateo	Artificial island in Foster City Lagoon. Residential.
Greco Island		37°31′04″N 122°10′59″W	San Mateo	This 817 acres (331 ha) island in San Francisco Bay near Redwood City is part of the Don Edwards San Francisco Bay National Wildlife Refuge.
Gull Rock		37°52′34″N 122°36′59″W	Marin	A Pacific island near Mount Tamalpais, about 200 feet (61 m) long.
Hog Island (Petaluma River)		38°09′33″N 122°32′18″W	Sonoma	Island in the Petaluma River wetlands.
Hog Island (Tomales Bay)		38°11′50″N 122°56′09″W	Marin	A 2-acre (0.81 ha) island in Tomales Bay.
Hooks Island		37°27′22″N 122°05′49″W	Santa Clara	36-acre (15 ha) tidal salt marsh island in the Palo Alto Baylands Nature Preserve
Kent Island		37°54′44″N 122°40′43″W	Marin	An island in Bolinas Lagoon, near the town of Bolinas. About 0.5 miles (0.80 km) long.
Mare Island		38°05′44″N 122°16′21″W	Solano	An island in San Pablo Bay near Vallejo. About 3.5 miles (5.6 km) long, site of a major shipyard.
East Marin Island		37°57′52″N 122°28′06″W	Marin	Near San Rafael, California. Pictured on the right in the image.
West Marin Island		37°57′57″N 122°28′22″W	Marin	Near San Rafael, California. Pictured on the left in the image.
Mussel Rock		37°40′01″N 122°29′50″W	San Mateo	A stack in the Pacific Ocean near Daly City. About 200 feet (61 m) long.
The Needles		37°49′45″N 122°28′42″W	Marin	Rock islets at Lime Point in Fort Baker near the Golden Gate Bridge's northern cable house.
Newby Island		37°27′32.1″N 121°56′38.54″W	Santa Clara	Near Alviso, San Jose.
Ogilvie Island		37°27′55″N 122°00′37″W	Santa Clara	Near Alviso, San Jose.
Rat Rock		38°00′16″N 122°27′43″W	Marin	An 18-foot (5.5 m) tall rock north of China Camp.
Red Rock Island		37°55′45″N 122°25′51″W	Contra Costa, Marin and San Francisco	This uninhabited 5.8-acre (2.3 ha) island is located in San Francisco Bay just south of the Richmond–San Rafael Bridge, near the meeting point of three counties. It is privately owned.
San Pedro Rock		37°35′43″N 122°31′27″W	San Mateo	A Pacific island near the city of Pacifica. About 800 feet (240 m) long.
Seal Rocks (San Francisco, California)		37°46′43″N 122°30′58″W	San Francisco	A series of large rocks in the Pacific Ocean that host a sea lion colony.
Seal Rock (San Mateo County, California)		37°23′30″N 122°25′29″W	San Mateo	A Pacific island south of Half Moon Bay, about 500 feet (150 m) long.
The Sisters		37°59′18″N 122°26′28″W	Marin	A pair of small islands in San Pablo Bay, 2,000 feet (610 m) south of Point Saint Pedro.
Treasure Island		37°49′29″N 122°22′16″W	San Francisco	This 403-acre (163 ha) artificial island in San Francisco Bay is tied to Yerba Buena Island. It was dredged out of the bay to house the Golden Gate International Exposition of 1939-40.
Yerba Buena Island		37°48′36″N 122°21′58″W	San Francisco	This island in San Francisco Bay is home to a Coast Guard station. The San Francisco–Oakland Bay Bridge passes through it by means of a tunnel.

=== Farallon Islands ===
The Farallon Islands are a group of rugged small islands over 20 miles (32 km) offshore from the mainland of the City and County of San Francisco, which they are also formally within. They consist of over twenty small islets divided into north, south and middle sections, as well as a major bank, Fanny Shoal. The surrounding waters were once used as a disposal site for radioactive waste.

Island	Image	Coordinates	Description
Aulone Island and Great Arch Rock		37°42′08″N 123°00′15″W	North of Southeast Farallon Island, measuring 200 feet (61 m) wide and 400 feet (120 m) long.
Drunk Uncle Islets			Group of small islets north of Maintop Island.
Farallón Viscaíno			
Middle Farallon Island		37°43′38″N 123°01′56″W	Medium-sized islet 1.8 miles (2.9 km) northwest of Southeast Farallon Island. It is 210 feet (64 m) long and has an area of 0.8 acres (0.32 ha).
North Farallon Island		37°45′44″N 123°05′53″W	Medium-sized islet 500 feet (150 m) long and 100 feet (30 m) high, covering 2 acres (0.81 ha).
Peñasco Quebrado			
Piedra Guadalupe			
Island of St. James		37°46′00″N 123°06′05″W	Medium-sized islet 3 acres (1.2 ha) in size, measuring 410 feet (120 m) long and 154 feet (47 m) high.
Sea Lion Rock		37°42′10″N 123°00′19″W	Small islet northwest of Aulon Island, about 130 feet (40 m) long.
Seal Rock		37°41′38″N 123°00′12″W	Small islet south of Southeast Farallon Island, with a maximum height of 82 feet (25 m).
Maintop Island		37°41′57″N 123°00′40″W	West of Southeast Farallon Island, and has a maximum height of 223 feet (68 m).
Southeast Farallon Island		37°41′50″N 123°00′11″W	Is the largest of the Farallons, covering 0.19 square miles (0.49 km^{2}). It is the only inhabited Farallon Island, and is also the site of Farallon Island Light.
Sugarloaf Island		37°42′13″N 123°00′12″W	Directly to the northeast of Aulone and Great Arch Rock, about 80 feet (24 m) high.

=== Suisun Bay ===
Suisun Bay is an arm of the San Francisco Bay estuary which connects the Sacramento and San Joaquin Rivers to the Carquinez Strait.

Island	Image	Coordinates	County	Description
Chipps Island		38°03′19″N 121°54′43″W	Solano	
Dutton Island		38°04′54″N 121°58′14″W	Solano	
Freeman Island		38°04′46″N 121°59′09″W	Solano	Small island, second from top on left hand of frame.
Grizzly Island		38°09′05″N 121°58′22″W	Solano	
Hammond Island		38°06′18″N 121°56′15″W	Solano	
Joice Island		38°09′00″N 122°03′34″W	Solano	A marshy island 6 miles (9.7 km) long, north of Grizzly Bay.
Morrow Island		38°07′00″N 122°05′11″W	Solano	A small island that has an elevation of 2 meters- 7 feet.
Point Buckler Island		38°05′46″N 122°00′58″W	Solano	A private marshy island of 39 acres (16 ha), with some history as a kiteboarding destination.
Roe Island		38°04′21″N 122°02′05″W	Solano	In Suisun Bay. On far right of picture (partially out of frame).
Ryer Island		38°04′58″N 122°00′52″W	Solano	475-hectare (1,170-acre) island, between Suisun Bay and Suisun Cutoff. About 2 miles (3.2 km) long. Largest island in the photo.
Seal Islands		38°03′20″N 122°02′50″W	Contra Costa	In Suisun Bay.
Simmons Island		38°05′49″N 121°59′26″W	Solano	
Snag Island		38°04′22″N 121°58′32″W	Solano	Smallest island in the photo, top center.
Van Sickle Island		38°04′00″N 121°54′04″W	Solano	An island 2.5 miles (4.0 km) long at the junction of the Sacramento River, San Joaquin River, and Suisun Bay.
Wheeler Island		38°05′06″N 121°56′15″W	Solano	

== Sacramento–San Joaquin River Delta ==
The Sacramento–San Joaquin River Delta is an inverted delta at the juncture of the Sacramento and San Joaquin rivers. There are about 57 named islands in the Delta.

Island	Image	Coordinates	County	Description
Andrus Island		38°09′28″N 121°35′54″W	Sacramento	3,000-hectare (7,400-acre) island, bounded by Sacramento River, Georgiana Slough, Mokelumne River, San Joaquin River, Jackson Slough, and Seven Mile Slough.
Bacon Island		37°58′36″N 121°33′08″W	San Joaquin	2,200-hectare (5,400-acre) island, bounded by Connection Slough, Old River, Woodward Island, and Middle River
Bethel Island		38°01′53″N 121°38′27″W	Contra Costa	1,450-hectare (3,600-acre) island, bounded by Taylor Slough, Piper Slough, Sand Mound Slough, and Dutch Slough
Bishop Tract				
Brack Tract				
Byron Tract				
Bouldin Island		38°06′15″N 121°32′05″W	San Joaquin	2,400-hectare (5,900-acre) island bounded by South Mokelumne River, Little Potato Slough, Potato Slough, and Mokelumne River.
Bradford Island		38°04′38″N 121°39′48″W	Contra Costa	885-hectare (2,190-acre) island in the lower delta bounded by the San Joaquin River, False River and the Bradford Island canal/slough. Accessible only by Ferry via Jersey Island, just south of it.
Browns Island		37°57′37″N 121°21′21″W	Contra Costa	275-hectare (680-acre) island, bounded by Middle Slough, New York Slough, and Suisun Bay. On the left in photo.
Canal Ranch Tract				
Coney Island		37°50′45″N 121°32′58″W	Contra Costa	
Dead Horse Island		38°13′45″N 121°30′08″W	Sacramento	
Decker Island		38°05′26″N 121°43′09″W	Solano	Small island on the top-left in photo.
Empire Tract				
Fabian Tract				
Fay Island		37°56′55″N 121°33′55″W	San Joaquin	
Glanville Tract				
Grand Island		38°14′08″N 121°34′45″W	Sacramento	
Hastings Tract				
Holland Tract				
Hotchkiss Tract				
Jersey Island		38°02′11″N 121°41′09″W	Contra Costa	1,425-hectare (3,520-acre) island, bounded by False River, Piper Slough, Taylor Slough, Dutch Slough and San Joaquin River.
Jones Tract		upper: 37°55′12″N 121°28′35″W lower:37°57′16″N 121°29′38″W (lower)	San Joaquin	4,900-hectare (12,000-acre) island (tracts, Upper- and Lower-), bounded by Empire Cut, Whiskey Slough, Trapper Slough, and Middle River, 10 km east of Stockton
King Island		38°03′56″N 121°26′12″W	San Joaquin	1,300-hectare (3,200-acre) island bounded by White Slough, Bishop Cut, Disappointment Slough, and Honker Cut
Kings Island		37°51′29″N 121°34′08″W	Contra Costa	3.5-hectare (8.6-acre) island in Old River
Little Mandeville Island		38°00′38″N 121°33′54″W	San Joaquin	
Little Tinsley Island				
Mandeville Island		38°02′05″N 121°32′56″W	San Joaquin	
McDonald Island		38°00′05″N 121°29′24″W	San Joaquin	2,400-hectare (5,900-acre) island, bounded by San Joaquin River, Middle River, Latham Slough, and Empire Cut.
Medford Island		38°02′14″N 121°30′41″W	San Joaquin	
Merritt Island		38.3554°N 121.5503°W	Yolo	A 5,000 acres (2,000 ha) island formed by the Sacramento River to the southeast and Elk Slough to the west, located directly across the Sacramento from Hood.
Mildred Island		37°59′11″N 121°31′23″W	San Joaquin	
Netherlands Island				
Neville Island				
New Hope Tract				
Orwood Tract				
Palm Tract				
Pierson District				
Prospect Island		38°14′47″N 121°39′56″W	Solano	
Quimby Island		38°01′31″N 121°34′17″W	Contra Costa	
Rhode Island		37°59′59″N 121°34′31″W	Contra Costa	
Rindge Tract				
Rio Blanco Tract				
Roberts Island		37°54′18″N 121°23′07″W	San Joaquin	
Ruff and Ready Island			San Joaquin River	An approximately 2.3-square-mile island in Stockton, California. A United States Navy installation built there during World War II was phased out in 1995 and later transferred to the Port of Stockton.
Ryer Island		38°14′26″N 121°38′03″W	Solano	4,750-hectare (11,700-acre), bounded by Miner Slough and Steamboat Slough.
Sargent Barhart Tract				
Sherman Island		38°03′34″N 121°44′00″W	Sacramento	5,500-hectare (14,000-acre) island bounded by the Sacramento River, Three Mile Slough, and the San Joaquin River.
Shima Tract				
Shin Kee Tract				
Staten Island		38°09′52″N 121°30′59″W	San Joaquin	3,700-hectare (9,100-acre) island bounded and flanked by the North Mokelumne River and South Mokelumne River.
Stewart Tract				
Sutter Island		38.2913°N 121.5930°W	Sacramento	Formed by Sacramento River to the northeast, Steamboat Slough to the southeast, and Sutter Slough to the west. Located across the Sacramento River from Paintersville.
Sycamore Island				
Terminous Tract				
Twitchell Island		38°06′35″N 121°38′55″W	Sacramento	3,000-hectare (7,400-acre), bounded by Seven Mile Slough, San Joaquin River, and Three Mile Slough
Tyler Island		38°10′23″N 121°32′51″W	Sacramento	
Union Island		37°50′15″N 121°30′56″W	San Joaquin	
Van Sickle Island		38°04′00″N 121°54′04″W	Solano	
Veale Tract				
Venice Island		38°04′30″N 121°32′04″W	San Joaquin	1,250-hectare (3,100-acre) island bounded by Potato Slough, Little Connection Slough, Stockton Deepwater Channel Venice Cut, and San Joaquin River.
Victoria Island		37°53′24″N 121°32′05″W	San Joaquin	2,900-hectare (7,200-acre) island bounded by North Victoria Canal, Middle River, Victoria Canal, and Old River.
Webb Tract				
West Island		38°01′24″N 121°46′43″W	Sacramento	
Winter Island		38°02′32″N 121°50′55″W	Contra Costa	On the right in photo.
Woodward Island		37°55′42″N 121°32′46″W	San Joaquin	725-hectare (1,790-acre) island bounded by Bacon Island, Old River, Middle River, and Woodward Canal
Wright-Elmwood Tract				

== Channel Islands ==
The Channel Islands are a group of eight main islands and several minor islands in the Pacific Ocean off the coast of Santa Barbara, Los Angeles, and Ventura counties in Southern California. The four northern islands are protected in Channel Islands National Park, while two are used by the U.S. Navy.

Island	Image	Coordinates	Description
Anacapa Island		34°00′16″N 119°23′59″W	Located 14 miles (23 km) off the coast of Ventura, California. It contains 728 acres (295 ha) of land spread across three mountainous islets. The island has only three permanent residents. Part of the Greater Los Angeles Area.
Begg Rock		33°21′45″N 119°41′52″W	A 15-foot (4.6 m) high rock, located 8 miles (13 km) from San Nicolas Island.
Prince Island		34°03′29″N 120°20′01″W	Located near San Miguel Island and measures about 35 acres (14 ha).
San Clemente Island		32°54′00″N 118°30′03″W	Southernmost Channel Island, containing 56.81 square miles (147.1 km^{2}) of land. It is 24 miles (39 km) long. An active U.S. Navy base is located on the island. In Los Angeles County.
San Juan Island		32°28′41″N 119°12′54″W	Historical San Juan Island, modern Cortes Bank, is a high seamount, an island submerged 6 feet and more, 96 mi SW of San Pedro, 111 mi (166 km) W of Pt Loma, and 47 mi (82 km) SW of San Clemente Island. The outermost feature in the Channel Islands, it has been visible as an island from elevations on San Clemente Island on clear days, and known for some of the world’s largest surf. Offshore from Orange County.
San Miguel Island		34°02′23″N 120°22′31″W	Westernmost Channel Island, measuring 8 miles (13 km) long, 3.7 miles (6.0 km) wide, and containing 9,325 acres (3,774 ha) of land. The island is uninhabited, and is rarely visited. Part of the Greater Los Angeles Area.
San Nicolas Island		33°14′58″N 119°30′01″W	Is said to be the most remote island of the Channel Islands, and is used by the U.S. Navy as a weapons testing and training facility. It has no civilian inhabitants, but is inhabited by military personnel. It covers 14,562 acres (5,893 ha). Part of the Greater Los Angeles Area.
Santa Barbara Island		33°28′32″N 119°02′10″W	Smallest Channel Island at 640 acres (260 ha) in area; it is located roughly between San Nicolas and Santa Catalina Islands. Part of the Greater Los Angeles Area.
Santa Catalina Island		33°23′00″N 118°25′03″W	The most populous of the Channel Islands, with 3,696 residents as of 2000. It is about 22 miles (35 km) long with a maximum width of 8 miles (13 km). It covers 74.98 square miles (194.2 km^{2}). In Los Angeles County.
Santa Cruz Island		34°02′25″N 119°50′37″W	Santa Cruz Island measures 22 miles (35 km) long with an average width of 4 miles (6.4 km), covering 96.5 square miles (250 km^{2}). It is the largest Channel Island. The island is now on public land, but was previously the largest privately owned island of the continental United States. Part of the Greater Los Angeles Area.
Santa Rosa Island		33°57′00″N 120°06′04″W	Santa Rosa Island occupies 83.1 square miles (215 km^{2}), and is the second largest Channel Island. The island has a permanent population of 2 persons, and is about 26 miles (42 km) off the coast of Santa Barbara, California. Part of the Greater Los Angeles area.
Shag Rock		33°29′13″N 119°02′10″W	Small islet located off the north shore of Santa Barbara Island, and is only about 1 acre (0.40 ha).
Sutil Island		33°27′50″N 119°02′54″W	Located off the southwest shore of Santa Barbara Island, and is about 12 acres (4.9 ha). It is named for a Spanish ship exploring the West Coast in an expedition led by Sebastián Vizcaíno.

== San Pedro Bay ==
Island	Image	Coordinates	Description
Island Chaffee		33°44′23″N 118°08′20″W	An artificial island/oil platform named after astronaut Roger B. Chaffee who died in the Apollo 1 accident. Located in San Pedro Bay.
Deadman's Island		33°43′25″N 118°15′57″W	An island with a landmark mound at the mouth of Los Angeles Harbor, flattened in 1928 for a Federal Prison and Coast Guard Base. Joined by a short causeway to Terminal Island, the newer island is sometimes referred to as Isla del Umberto or more often, Reservation Point. The former mound with a natural arch was called “Deadman’s Island” for the graves at top.
Freeman Island		33°44′29″N 118°09′45″W	An artificial island/oil platform named after astronaut Theodore Freeman who died in a crash. Located in San Pedro Bay.
Island Grissom		33°45′33″N 118°10′53″W	An artificial island/oil platform named after astronaut Gus Grissom who died in the Apollo 1 accident. Located in San Pedro Bay.
Naples Islands		33°27′05″N 118°43′12″W	A neighborhood in Long Beach that consists of three different islands divided by canals which empty out into Alamitos Bay.
Terminal Island		33°45′25″N 118°14′53″W	An expansion of natural Rattlesnake Island, which stretched between San Pedro and Long Beach. Earth dredged from shallow San Pedro Bay was used as landfill. It is 3.5 miles (5.6 km) long and covers an area of 4.46 square miles (11.6 km^{2}). The picture shows Reservation Point, formed after Deadman’s Island was leveled.
Island White		33°45′10″N 118°09′33″W	An artificial island/oil platform named after astronaut Ed White who died in the Apollo 1 accident; Located in San Pedro Bay.

== Newport Bay ==
The bay associated with Newport Harbor and the city of Newport Beach, California.

Island	Image	Coordinates	Description
Balboa Island		33°36′23″N 117°53′40″W	A 50-hectare (120-acre), densely populated harbor island with 1,500 expensive homes. Partially created as a result of the Santa Ana River flooding in 1824, then artificially expanded to its present size.
Bay Island		33°36′25″N 117°54′18″W	West of Balboa Island.
Collins Island		33°36′31″N 117°54′1″W	A small island located at the end of Balboa Island
Harbor Island		33°36′01″N 117°54′10″W	
Lido Isle		33°36′14″N 117°55′02″W	Northwest of Balboa Island.
Linda Isle		33°36′50″N 117°54′13″W	
Newport Island			Located at the far west end of the bay

== Lake islands ==
Island	Image	Coordinates	Lake	Description
Beaver Island		40.7566°N 122.3325°W	Shasta Lake	An island in the Pit River Arm of the lake, located just west of the Pit River Bridge and Bridge Bay Resort/marina.
Fannette Island		38°57′15″N 120°06′02″W	Lake Tahoe	The only major island in Lake Tahoe, located within Emerald Bay.
Main Island		34°23′41″N 119°20′34″W	Lake Casitas	A 1.5 miles (2.4 km) long, 850-foot (260 m) high island rising 512 feet (156 m) above the lake surface.
Mullet Island			Salton Sea	A small volcanic island near the southern end of the Salton Sea near the mouth of the Alamo River
Negit Island		38°01′22″N 119°02′59″W	Mono Lake	A young volcanic cone, connected to the mainland during low water. It is an important stop for nesting birds, and as a result is closed to visitation during April.
Paoha Island		38°00′02″N 119°01′57″W	Mono Lake	2.5 miles (4.0 km) long and 2 miles (3.2 km) wide, and is the largest Mono Lake island.
Rattlesnake Island		39°00′36″N 122°40′44″W	Clear Lake	A 53-acre (21 ha) island desired by the Elem Indian Colony.
Red Island			Salton Sea	A volcanic island near the southern end of the sea, on the San Andreas Fault.
Ridgeville Islands		40.8453°N 122.7875°W	Trinity Lake	A group of forested islets in the Stewart Fork arm about 4 mi (6.4 km) northwest of Trinity Dam.
Ski Island		40.7592°N 122.2587°W	Shasta Lake	An island in the Pit River arm of the lake, located shortly north of Bear Mountain.
Slaughterhouse Island		40.7651°N 122.3835°W	Shasta Lake	An island in the Sacramento River Arm of the lake, located about 3 mi (4.8 km) northeast of Shasta Dam.

== River islands ==
Island	Image	Coordinates	River	Description
Cannibal Island		40.6582°N 124.2883°W	Eel River	An island in the estuary of the Eel River, bounded by the Eel River, Mosley Slough and Sevenmile Slough.
Circle Island		37.1468°N 120.7641°W	San Joaquin River	An island formed by side channels of the San Joaquin River in the San Luis National Wildlife Refuge near Los Banos.
Cobbs Island		36.9151°N 119.7692°W	San Joaquin River	An island at mile 259 of the San Joaquin River north of Fresno, contiguous with nearby Island No. 1.
Cock Robin Island		40.6277°N 124.2775°W	Eel River	An island in the estuary of the Eel River, west of Loleta, between Eel River and Ropers Slough.
Deer Island		34.1176°N 114.3740°W	Colorado River	An island at mile 169 of the Colorado River on the California–Arizona border, near Parker, Arizona.
Foster Island		39.8527°N 122.0629°W	Sacramento River	An island at mile 211 of the Sacramento River near Merrills Landing.
Golden State Island		39.6777°N 121.9533°W	Sacramento River	An island at mile 190 of the Sacramento River between Sacramento River and Murphy Slough, directly across from Phelan Island.
Hall Island		33.8713°N 114.5188°W	Colorado River	An island at mile 145 of the Colorado River, west of the California–Arizona border.
Hanson Island		39.4812°N 122.0071°W	Sacramento River	An island at mile 171 of the Sacramento River, near Codora, between Sacramento River and Beehive Bend.
Happy Isles		37.7317°N 119.5587°W	Merced River	A group of small islands in the Merced River at the upper end of Yosemite Valley, in Yosemite National Park.
Hartley Island		39.5198°N 121.9906°W	Sacramento River	An island at mile 174 of the Sacramento River near Glenn.
Horse Island		33.8610°N 114.5152°W	Colorado River	An island at mile 144 of the Colorado River, west of the California–Arizona border.
Ledger Island		36.9489°N 119.7403°W	San Joaquin River	An island at mile 264 of the San Joaquin River north of Fresno, shortly below Friant Dam.
Lower Foster Island		39.8457°N 122.0693°W	Sacramento River	An island at mile 210 of the Sacramento River near Merrills Landing, immediately south of Foster Island.
Mooney Island		40.1062°N 122.1418°W	Sacramento River	An island at mile 236 of the Sacramento River north of Gerber.
Mosley Island		40.6427°N 124.3001°W	Eel River	The westernmost and smallest named island in the Eel River estuary, bounded by Eel River, North Bay and Mosley Slough.
Packer Island		39.4450°N 122.0080°W	Sacramento River	An island at mile 167 of the Sacramento River near Codora, between Sacramento River and Packer Lake (oxbow lake in seasonal channel).
Phelan Island		39.6839°N 121.9646°W	Sacramento River	An island at mile 189 of the Sacramento River near Rotavele, between the Sacramento River and Negro Sam Slough, directly across from Golden State Island.
Ryan Island		39.6256°N 121.9858°W	Sacramento River	An island at mile 184 of the Sacramento River near Ordbend.
Scout Island		36.8593°N 119.8432°W	San Joaquin River	A seasonal island in the San Joaquin River in north Fresno.
Snaden Island		39.8141°N 122.0521°W	Sacramento River	An island at mile 207 of the Sacramento River near Capay, between the Sacramento River and Snaden Slough.
Todd Island		40.1144°N 122.1382°W	Sacramento River	An island at mile 237.5 of the Sacramento River near Dairyville.
Turner Island		37.1653°N 120.6721°W	San Joaquin River	A large island along the San Joaquin River and Mariposa Slough near Los Banos, in Merced National Wildlife Refuge.

== Other ==
Island	Image	Coordinates	Description
Rincon Island		34°20′51″N 119°26′43″W	A 1 acre (0.40 ha) artificial island off the coast of Ventura County, leased for oil and gas production.
San Mateo Rocks		33°24′17″N 117°37′02″W	Sea lion haul-out and scuba destination near San Clemente in Orange County
Smith Island		35°09′45″N 120°45′14″W	Rocky island in San Luis Bay, Avila Beach, California

== See also ==
- Geography of California
- List of islands of the United States
- Outline of California
- Peninsulas of California
