= Communities of Newport Beach, California =

List of neighborhoods in city of Newport Beach, CA

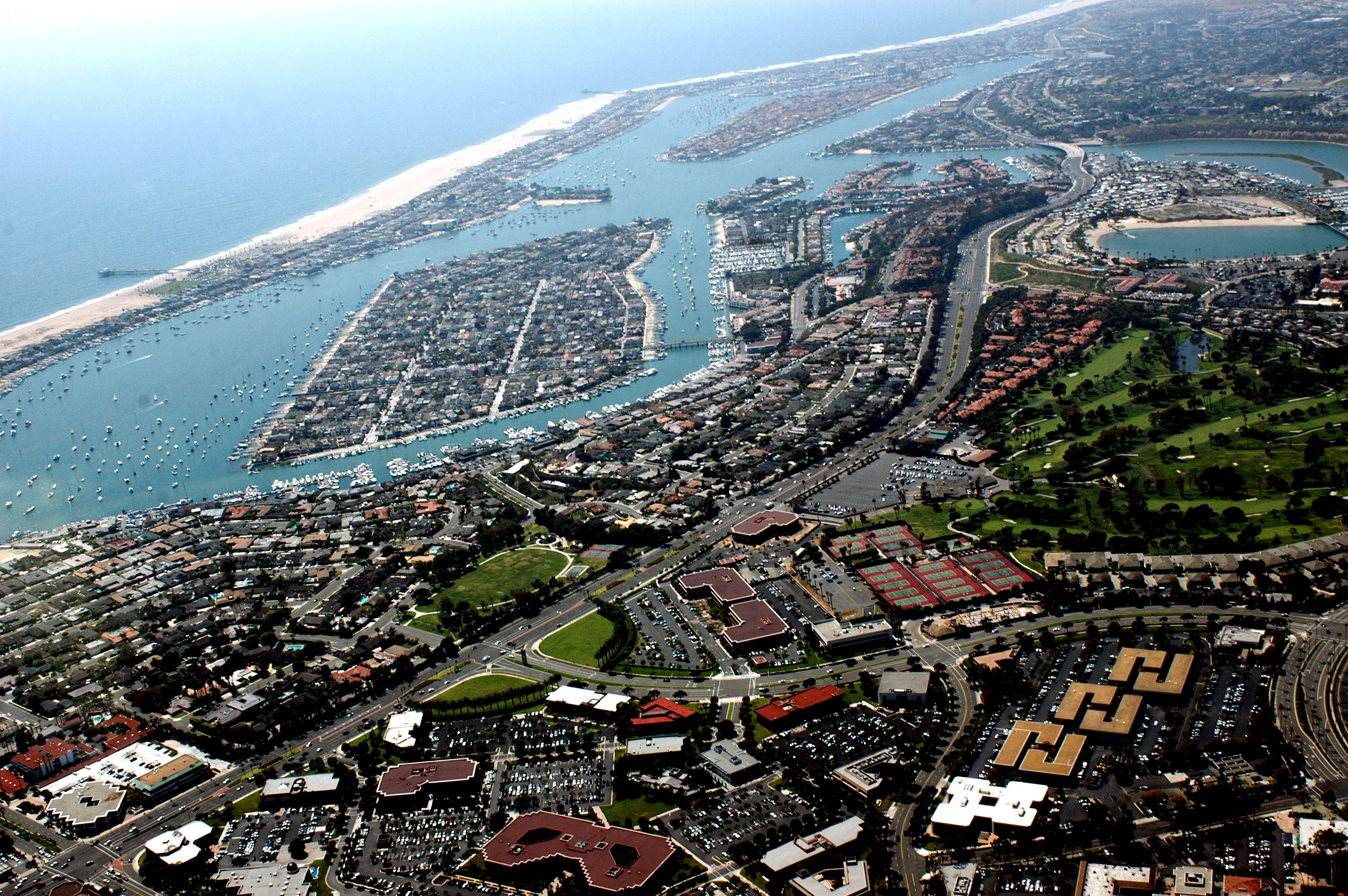
Aerial of Newport with focus on the Bay Islands

There are numerous Communities in Newport Beach. These include:

== Newport Beach communities ==
=== Central Newport Beach communities ===
- Big Canyon
- East Bluff
- Harbor View
- Newport Shores
- Dover Shores
- Bay Shores
- Lido Village
- Promontory Point
- Bonita Canyon
- Port Streets
- One Ford Road
- Belcourt, Newport Beach
- Harbor Ridge, Newport Beach

=== Coastal Newport Bay communities ===
Balboa Peninsula

- Balboa Peninsula, Newport Beach
- Newport Heights, Newport Beach
- Lido Isle, Newport Beach

=== Newport Beach Islands ===
- Balboa Island, Newport Beach
- Bay Island, Newport Beach
- Collins Island, Newport Beach
- Harbor Island, Newport Beach
- Linda Isle, Newport Beach
- Newport Island, Newport Beach

== Coastal Newport Beach communities ==
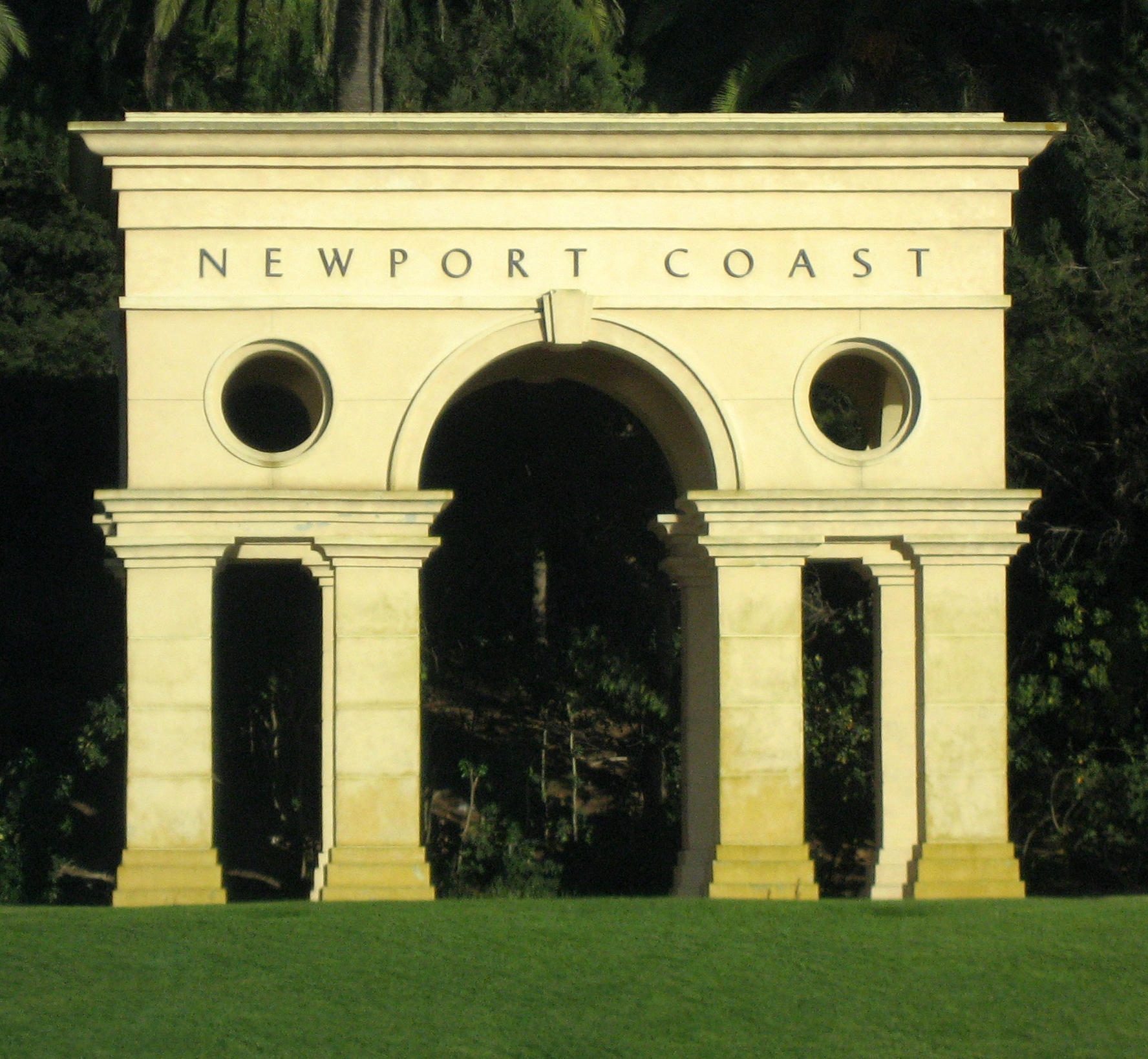
Newport Coast

- Corona del Mar, Newport Beach
- Newport Coast, Newport Beach

== Inland Newport Beach communities ==
- San Joaquin Hills, Newport Beach
- Santa Ana Heights, California

== See also ==
- Upper Newport Bay
- Newport Back Bay
