= Hammer Island =

Island in California

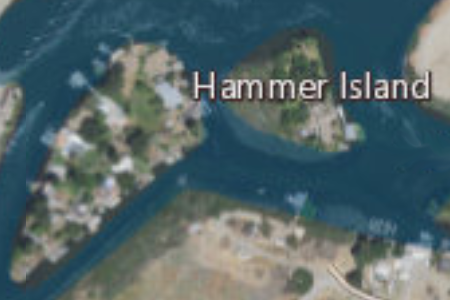
- USGS aerial imagery of Hammer Island; Mendota Canal is to the west, and Old River is to the east.

- Location within Sacramento-San Joaquin River Delta Location within California Location within the United States

Geography
- Location: Northern California
- Coordinates: 37°48′59″N 121°33′25″W
- Adjacent to: Sacramento–San Joaquin River Delta
- Highest elevation: 0 ft (0 m)

Administration
- United States
- State: California
- County: Contra Costa

Hammer Island is a small island in the Sacramento–San Joaquin River Delta, in Contra Costa County, California, originally named Santos Island, it was changed to Hammer Island after Hans Hammer purchased the island from Mr. Santos in 1939. Its coordinates are 37°48′59″N 121°33′25″W; the United States Geological Survey measured its elevation as 0 ft (0 m) in 1981, and it appears on a 1978 USGS map.
