= Mandeville Island =

Island in California, United States

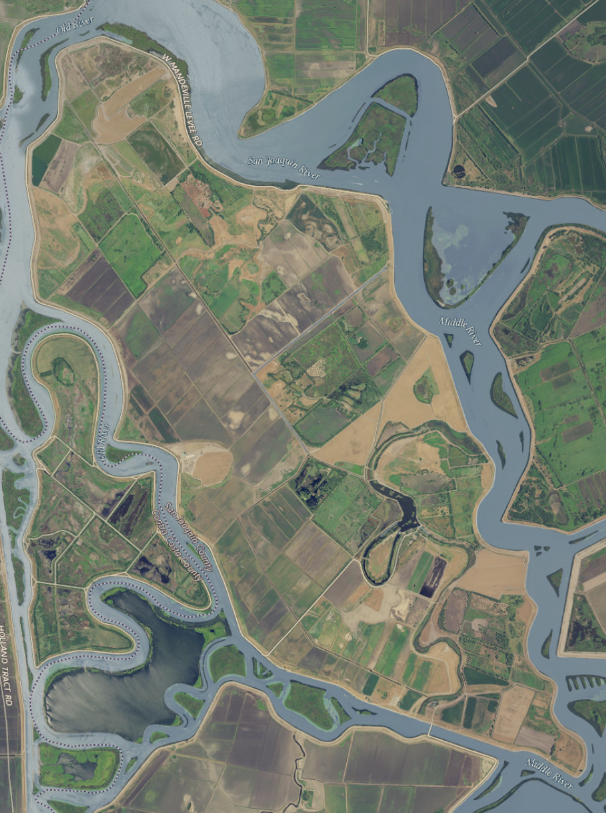
- USGS aerial imagery of the island.

- Location within Sacramento-San Joaquin River Delta Location within California Location within the United States

Geography
- Location: Northern California
- Coordinates: 38°02′05″N 121°32′56″W
- Adjacent to: Sacramento-San Joaquin River Delta
- Area: 5,500 acres (2,200 ha)

Administration
- United States
- State: California
- County: San Joaquin

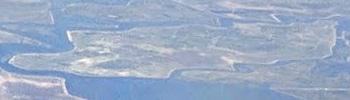
Mandeville Island and Quimby Island in an aerial photo taken looking toward the east in 2018.

Mandeville Island is an island in the Sacramento–San Joaquin Delta located about 15 miles (24 km) northwest of Stockton, in central California in the United States. The island covers about 5,500 acres (2,200 ha), and lies between the Old River to the west and Middle River to the east, both distributaries of the San Joaquin River-Stockton Deepwater Shipping Channel. The Connection Slough forms the island's southern end, and Sand Mound Slough borders the island to the north. The island lies directly to the east of Franks Tract State Recreation Area. It is in San Joaquin County, and managed by Reclamation District 2027.

== See also ==
- List of islands of California
