= Rhode Island (California) =

Island in California, United States

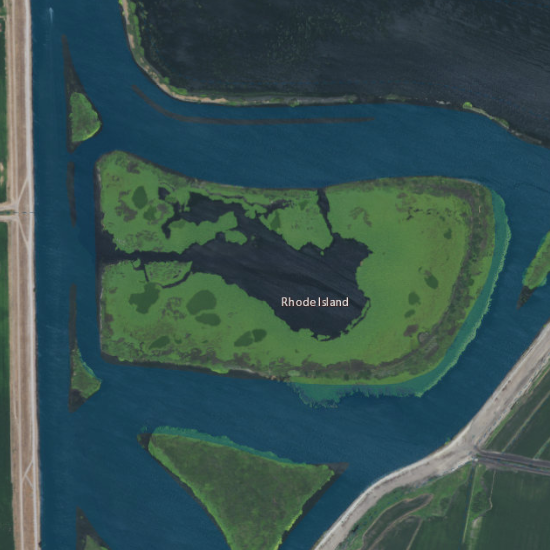
- USGS aerial imagery of Rhode Island, with Holland Tract to its west, Bacon Island to its southeast and the flooded Little Mandeville Island to its north.

- Location within Sacramento-San Joaquin River Delta Location within California Location within the United States

Geography
- Location: Northern California
- Coordinates: 37.9996445°N 121.5752300°W
- Adjacent to: Sacramento–San Joaquin River Delta
- Highest elevation: 0 ft (0 m)

Administration
- United States
- State: California
- County: Contra Costa

Rhode Island is a small, partially submerged island in the San Joaquin River delta, in California. It is part of Contra Costa County. Its coordinates are 37.9996445°N 121.5752300°W. It appears on a 1952 United States Geological Survey map of the area.
