= Jones Tract =

Island in California

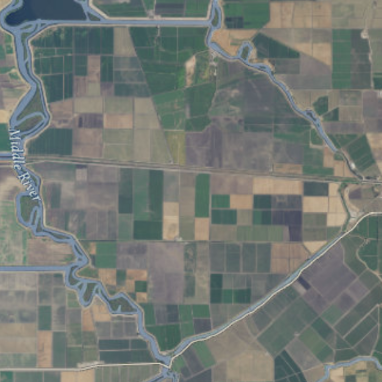
- USGS aerial imagery of the tract.

- Location within Sacramento-San Joaquin River Delta Location within California Location within the United States

Geography
- Location: Northern California
- Coordinates: 37.937158°N 121.486473°W
- Adjacent to: Sacramento-San Joaquin River Delta
- Area: 12,000 acres (4,900 ha)

Administration
- United States
- State: California
- County: San Joaquin

The Jones Tract is an island containing Lower Jones Tract and the Upper Jones Tract in the Sacramento-San Joaquin River Delta, fifteen kilometres west of Stockton. The 4,900 ha (12,000 acres) island is bounded on the north by Empire Cut, on the northeast by Whiskey Slough, on the southeast by Trapper Slough, and on the west, Middle River. The tracts are bifurcated by the parallel running Mokelumne Aqueduct, West Lower Jones Road, and a railroad originally built by the Achison Topeka and Santa Fe Railroad, which now carries freight trains of the BNSF Railway and Amtrak California's Gold Runner. It is in San Joaquin County, and managed by Reclamation District 2039. It appears on 1913 and 1952 United States Geological Survey maps of the area.

== 2004 levee failure ==
On 3 June 2004, the Upper Jones Tract levee near Woodward Island failed, inundating the entire island with more than 150,000 acre⋅ft (190,000,000 m^{3}) of water. The island, which lies 3 metres below sea level, required three weeks to repair the breach, and an additional five months for de-watering after the pumps were shut down on 18 December 2004. The levee failure resulted in approximately $90 million in repairs.

== See also ==
- List of islands of California
