= Jones Island =

Jones Island may refer to:

- Jones Island (South Australia)
- Jones Island, Milwaukee
- Jones Island State Park, in the San Juan Islands of Washington state
- Jones Island (Montana), an island in Montana
- Jones Tract (a.k.a. Lower and Upper Jones islands), in California
