= Rio Blanco Tract =

Island in California

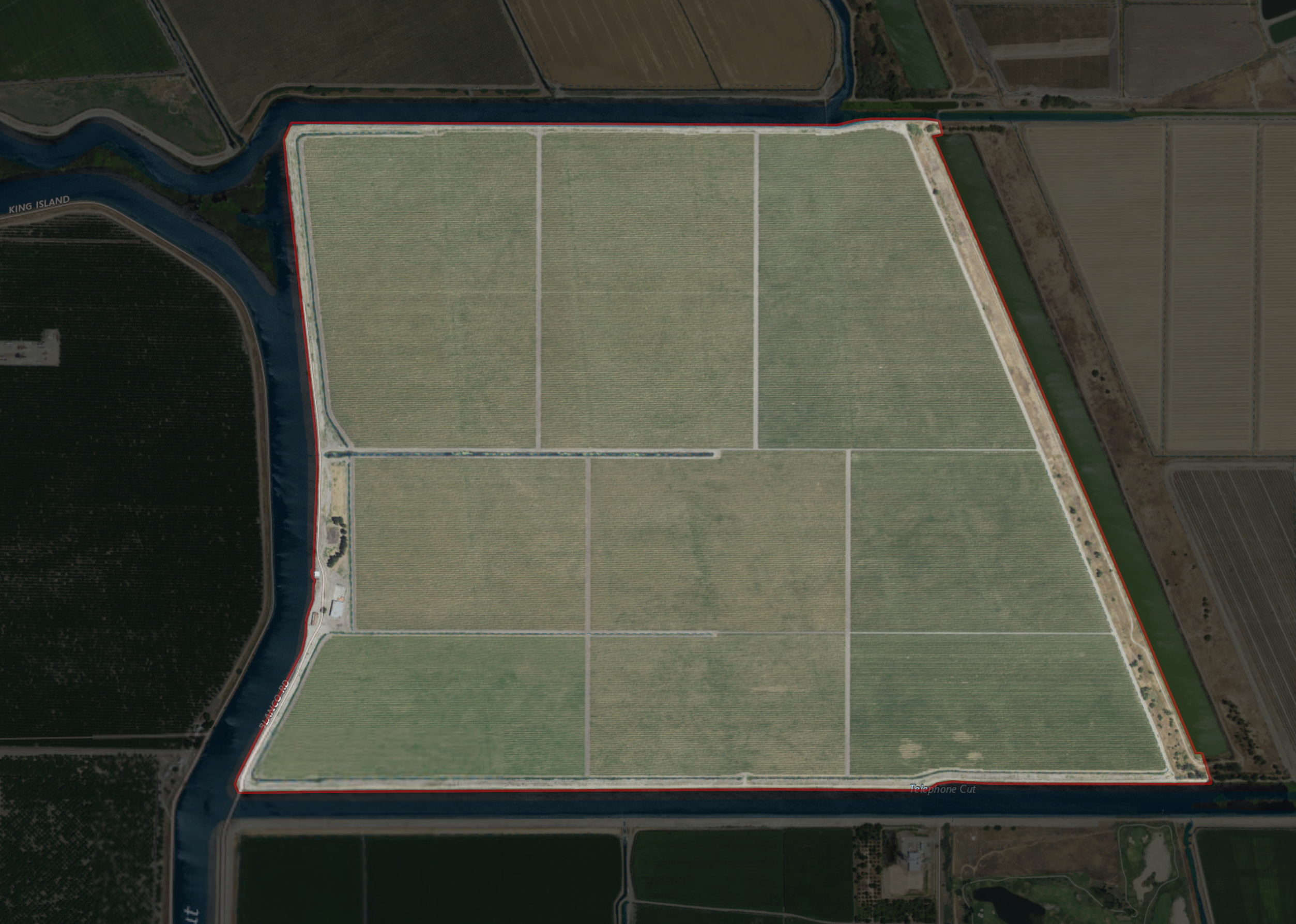
- USGS aerial imagery of the Rio Blanco Tract

- Location within Sacramento-San Joaquin River Delta Location within California Location within the United States

Geography
- Location: Northern California
- Coordinates: 38°04′46″N 121°24′18″W
- Adjacent to: Sacramento–San Joaquin River Delta
- Highest elevation: 0 ft (0 m)

Administration
- United States
- State: California
- County: San Joaquin

The Rio Blanco Tract is an island in the Sacramento–San Joaquin River Delta. It is part of San Joaquin County, California, and managed by Reclamation District 2114. Its coordinates are 38°04′46″N 121°24′18″W, and the United States Geological Survey measured its elevation as 0 ft (0 m) in 1981. It appears on a 1952 USGS map of the area.
