= Seal Islands (California) =

Islands in Suisun Bay, California

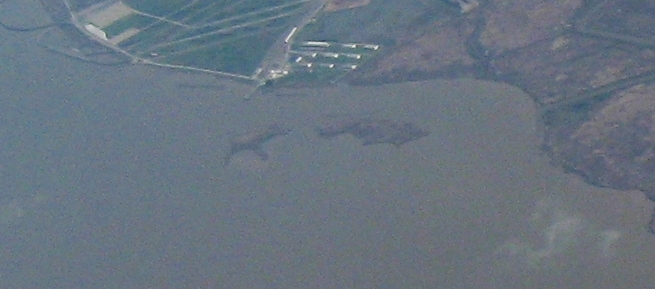
- An aerial photo of the Seal islands, viewed from the north, in 2009.

- Location within Sacramento-San Joaquin River Delta Location within San Francisco Bay Area Location within California Location within the United States

Geography
- Location: Northern California
- Coordinates: 38°03′20″N 122°02′50″W
- Adjacent to: Suisun Bay

Administration
- United States
- State: California
- County: Contra Costa

Seal Islands are a pair of islands in Suisun Bay at the mouth of the Sacramento-San Joaquin River Delta in Contra Costa County, California, 10 km east of Benicia, and 500 metres off-shore from the former Concord Naval Weapons Station and Port Chicago Naval Magazine.

== See also ==
- List of islands of California
