= Wright-Elmwood Tract =

Island in California

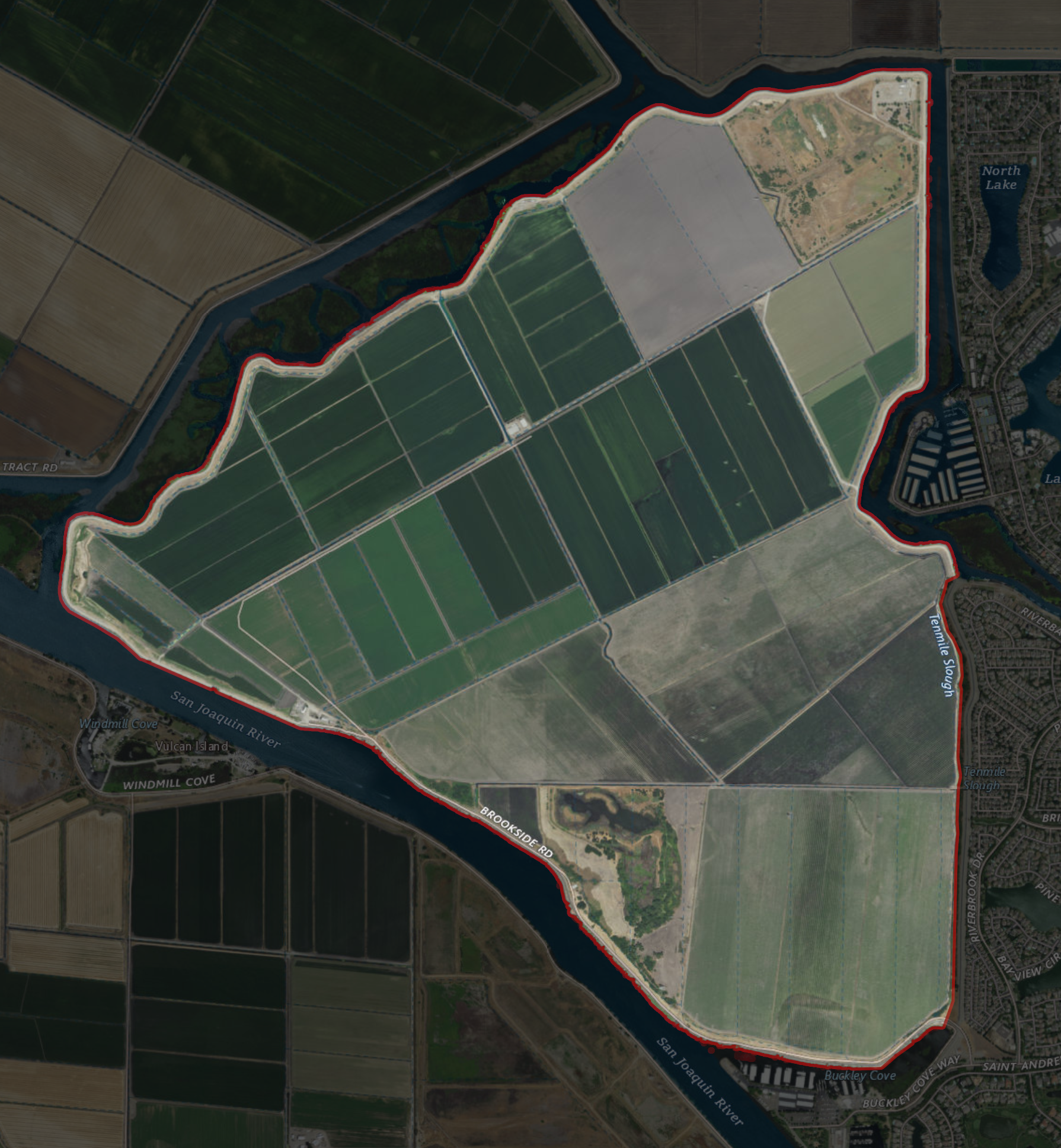
- USGS aerial imagery of the Wright-Elmwood Tract

- Location within Sacramento-San Joaquin River Delta Location within California Location within the United States

Geography
- Location: Northern California
- Coordinates: 37°59′23″N 121°22′50″W
- Adjacent to: Sacramento–San Joaquin River Delta
- Highest elevation: 0 ft (0 m)

Administration
- United States
- State: California
- County: San Joaquin

The Wright-Elmwood Tract (alternately referred to as the Wright Tract or the Elmwood Tract) is an island in the Sacramento–San Joaquin River Delta. It is part of San Joaquin County, California, and managed by Reclamation District 2119. Its coordinates are 37°59′23″N 121°22′50″W, and the United States Geological Survey measured its elevation as 0 ft (0 m) in 1981.
