= Stewart Tract =

Island in California

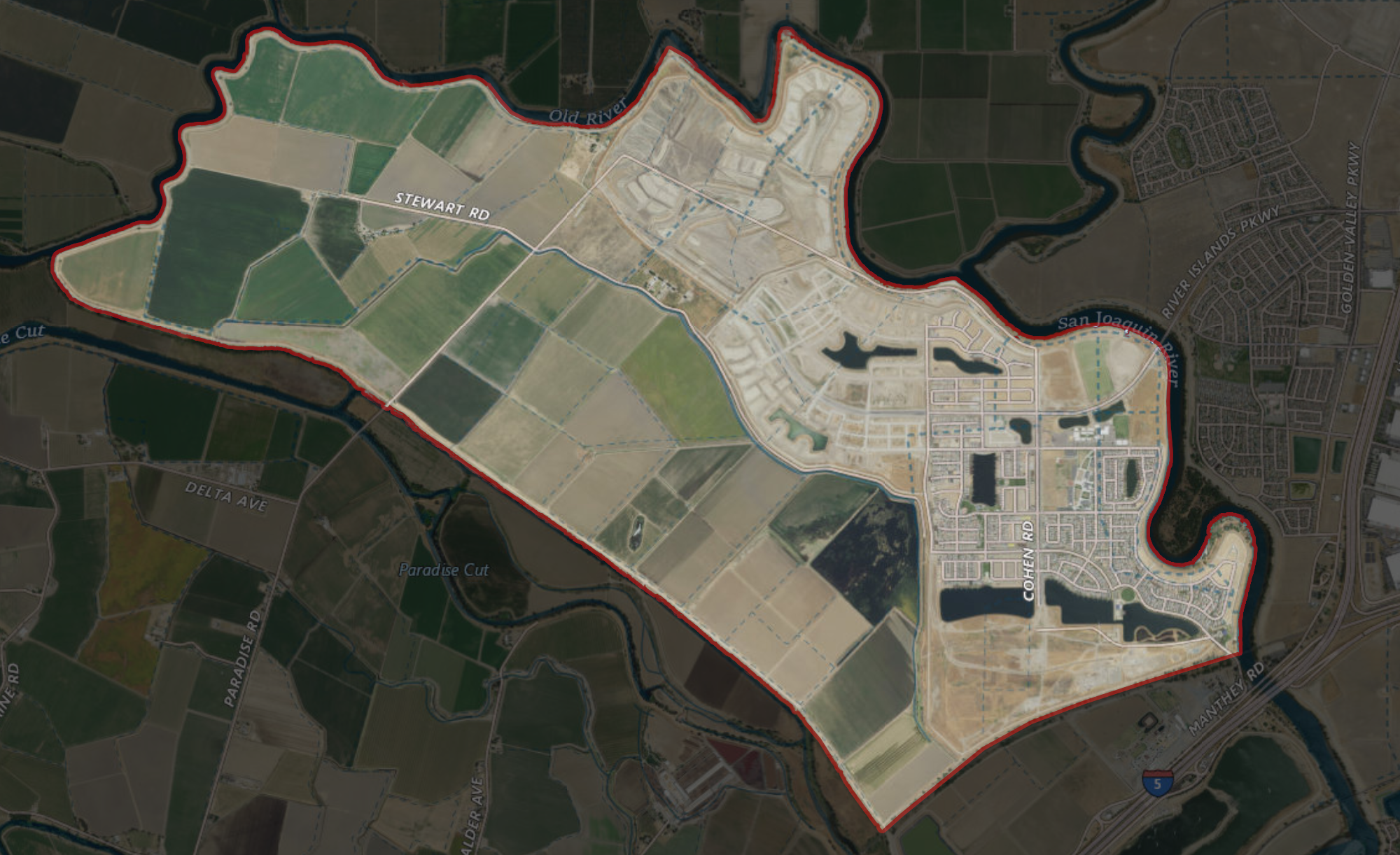
- USGS aerial imagery of the Stewart Tract

- Location within California Location within the United States

Geography
- Location: Northern California
- Coordinates: 37°48′13″N 121°20′53″W
- Adjacent to: Sacramento–San Joaquin River Delta
- Highest elevation: 13 ft (4 m)

Administration
- United States
- State: California
- County: San Joaquin

The Stewart Tract is an island in the Sacramento–San Joaquin River Delta. It is part of San Joaquin County, California, and managed by Reclamation District 2062. Its coordinates are 37°48′13″N 121°20′53″W, and the United States Geological Survey measured its elevation as 13 ft (4.0 m) in 1981.
