= Dead Horse Island =

Private island in California

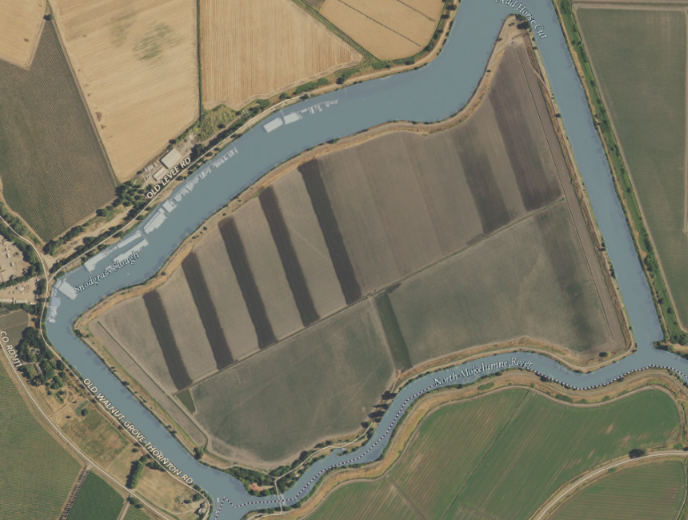
- USGS aerial imagery of Dead Horse Island.

- Location within Sacramento-San Joaquin River Delta Location within California Location within the United States

Geography
- Location: Northern California
- Coordinates: 38.2290821°N 121.5021750°W
- Adjacent to: Sacramento–San Joaquin River Delta

Administration
- United States
- State: California
- County: Sacramento

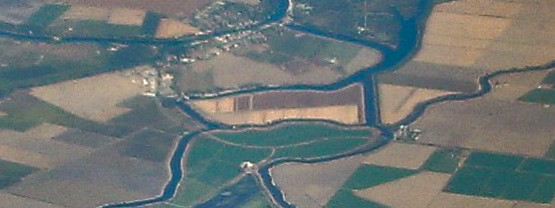
Dead Horse Island in an aerial photo from 2015

Dead Horse Island is a 230-acre private island in the San Joaquin River delta, in California. It is located in Sacramento County, owned by the Wilson Family and managed by Reclamation District 2111. Its coordinates are 38.2290821°N 121.5021750°W.
