= Coney Island (California) =

Island in California

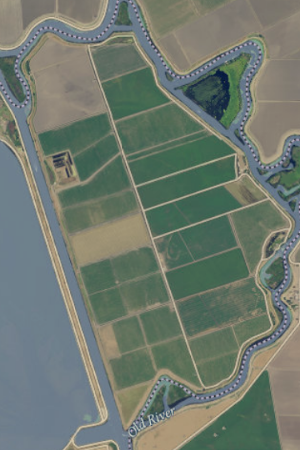
- USGS aerial photo of Coney Island (largest island).

- Location within Sacramento-San Joaquin River Delta Location within California Location within the United States

Geography
- Location: Northern California
- Coordinates: 37.846°N 121.549°W
- Adjacent to: Sacramento–San Joaquin River Delta

Administration
- United States
- State: California
- County: Contra Costa

Coney Island is a small island in the San Joaquin River delta, in California. It is part of Contra Costa County, and managed by Reclamation District 2117. Its coordinates are 37.8457598°N 121.5493939°W. It appears on a 1978 United States Geological Survey map of the area.
