= Woodward Island =

Island in California, United States

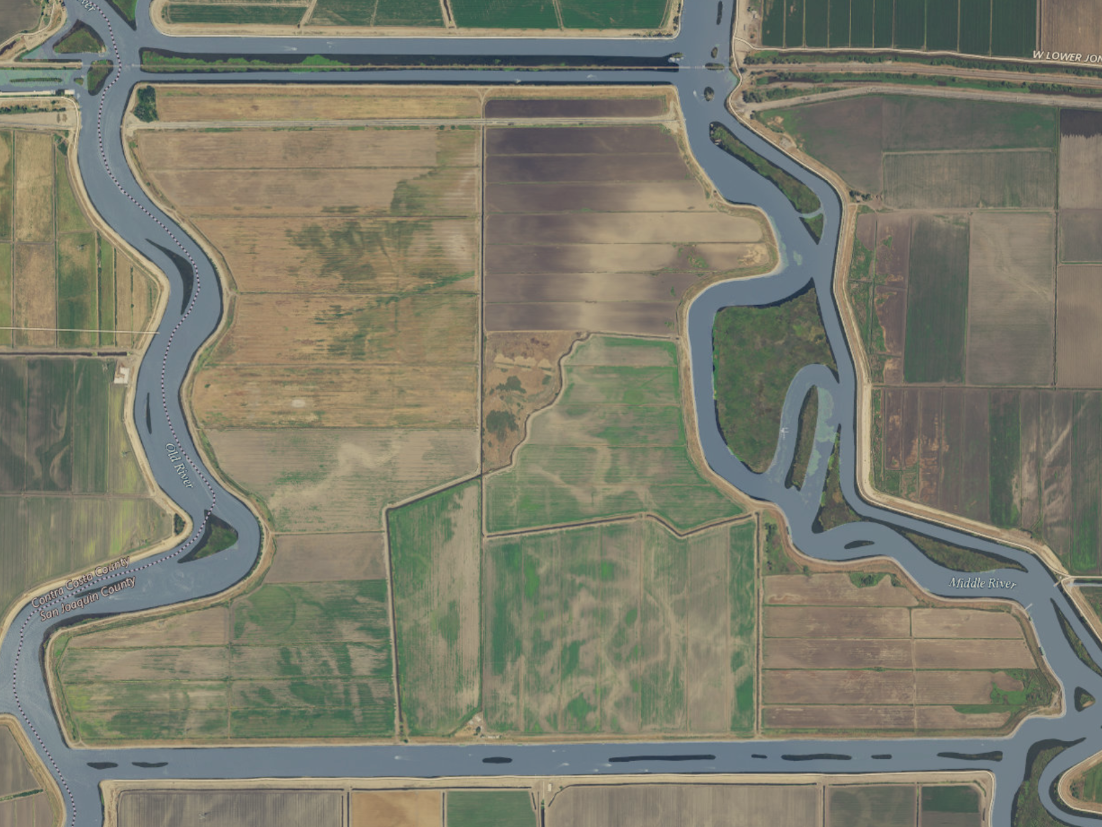

- Location within Sacramento-San Joaquin River Delta Location within California Location within the United States

Geography
- Location: Northern California
- Coordinates: 37.928258°N 121.546062°W
- Adjacent to: Sacramento-San Joaquin River Delta
- Area: 1,790 acres (720 ha)

Administration
- United States
- State: California
- County: San Joaquin

Woodward Island is an island in the Sacramento-San Joaquin River Delta, twenty kilometres east of Antioch, and twenty kilometres west of Stockton. The 725 ha (1,790-acre) island is bounded on the west by Old River, on the north by Bacon Island, on the east by Middle River, and Woodward Canal on the south. It is in San Joaquin County, and managed by Reclamation District 2072. It appears on 1913 and 1952 United States Geological Survey maps of the area.

== See also ==
- List of islands of California
