= Seal Rock (San Mateo County, California) =

Small island in California

Nickname: Sea Lion Rock
- Location within San Francisco Bay Area Location within California Location within the United States

Geography
- Location: Pacific Ocean
- Coordinates: 37°23′30″N 122°25′29″W
- Area: 0.9 ha (2.2 acres)
- Length: 180 m (590 ft)
- Width: 50 m (160 ft)
- Coastline: 535 m (1755 ft)
- Highest elevation: 1 m (3 ft)

Administration
- United States
- State: California
- County: San Mateo

Seal Rock is a small island in San Mateo County, California. It lies just off the county's Pacific coast, about halfway between Half Moon Bay and San Gregorio.

== See also ==
- List of islands of California
