= Mildred Island =

Island in California

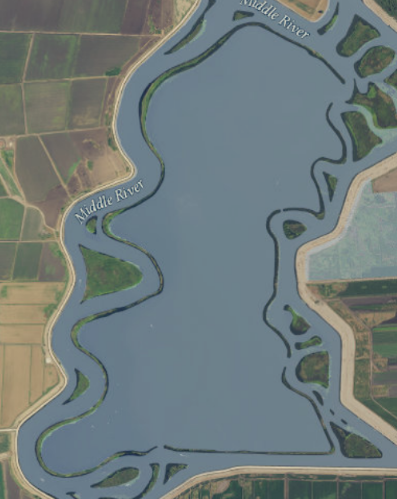
- USGS aerial imagery of Mildred Island; the only part that remains above water is its levees.

- Location within Sacramento-San Joaquin River Delta Location within California Location within the United States

Geography
- Location: Northern California
- Coordinates: 37.9863117°N 121.5230069°W
- Adjacent to: Sacramento–San Joaquin River Delta

Administration
- United States
- State: California
- County: San Joaquin

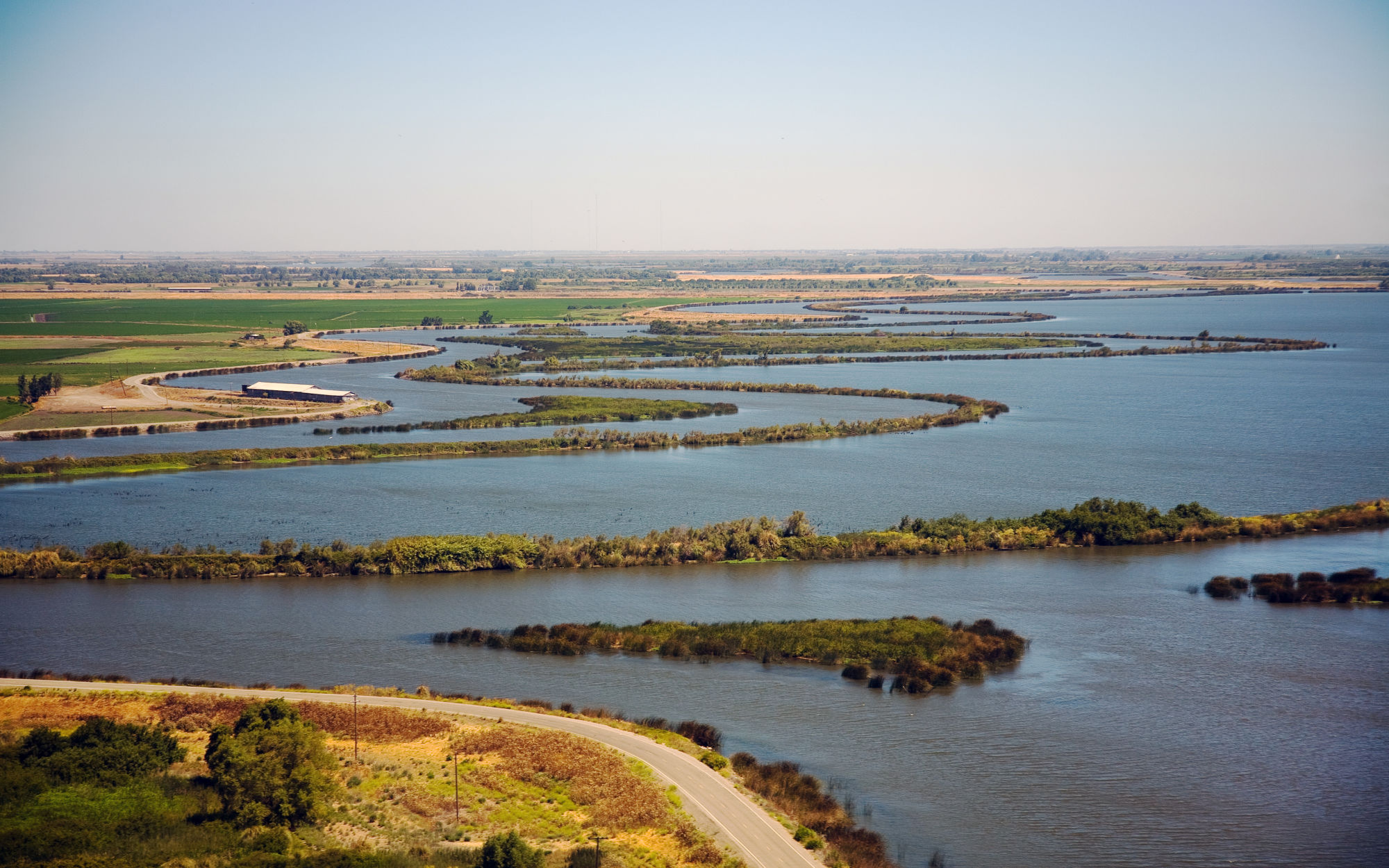
An aerial photo of Mildred Island taken from the southwest, with Bacon Island to the left, and Mandeville Island in the background.

Mildred Island is a submerged island in the San Joaquin River delta, in California. It is part of San Joaquin County. It flooded in 1983, and the land was abandoned. Its coordinates are 37.9863117°N 121.5230069°W. It appears on 1913 and 1952 United States Geological Survey maps of the area.
