= Union Island (California) =

Island in California

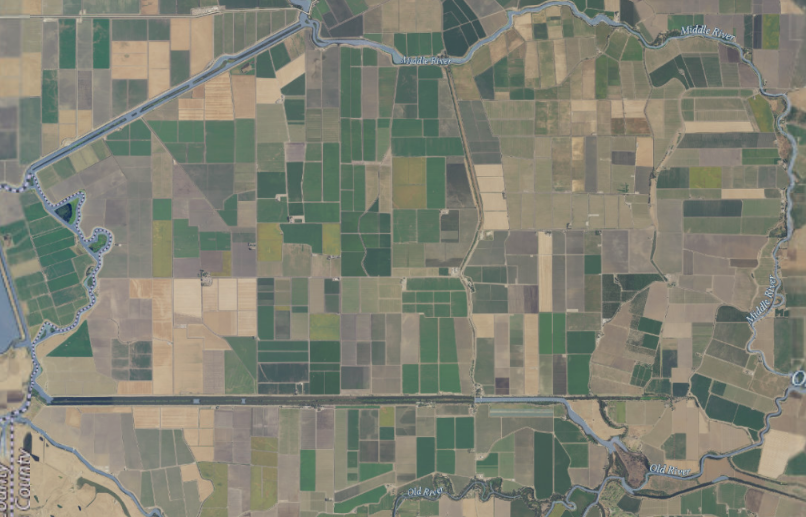
- USGS aerial imagery of the island.

- Location within Sacramento-San Joaquin River Delta Location within California Location within the United States

Geography
- Location: Northern California
- Coordinates: 37.8374268°N 121.5155042°W
- Adjacent to: Sacramento–San Joaquin River Delta

Administration
- United States
- State: California
- County: San Joaquin

Union Island is a small island in the San Joaquin River delta, in California. It is part of San Joaquin County, and managed by Reclamation Districts 1 and 2. Its coordinates are 37.8374268°N 121.5155042°W.
