= Fay Island =

Island in California

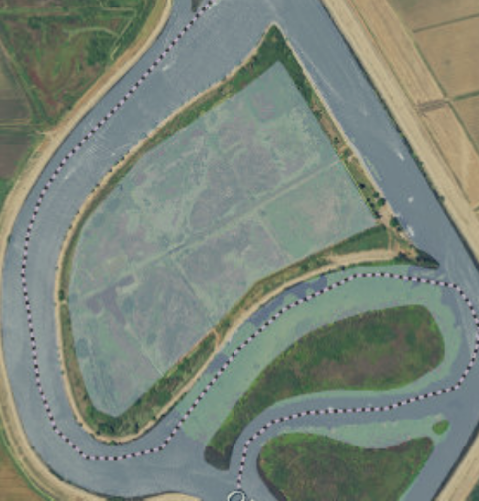
- USGS aerial imagery of Fay Island

- Location within Sacramento-San Joaquin River Delta Location within California Location within the United States

Geography
- Location: Northern California
- Coordinates: 37.9485348°N 121.5652291°W
- Adjacent to: Sacramento–San Joaquin River Delta

Administration
- United States
- State: California
- County: San Joaquin

Fay Island is a small, partially submerged island in the San Joaquin River delta, in California. It is part of San Joaquin County, and managed by Reclamation District 2113. Its coordinates are 37.9485348°N 121.5652291°W. It appears, almost completely submerged, on a 1952 United States Geological Survey map of the area.
