= Linda Isle, Newport Beach =

Settlement in California, United States of America

Coordinates: 33.614°N 117.903°W

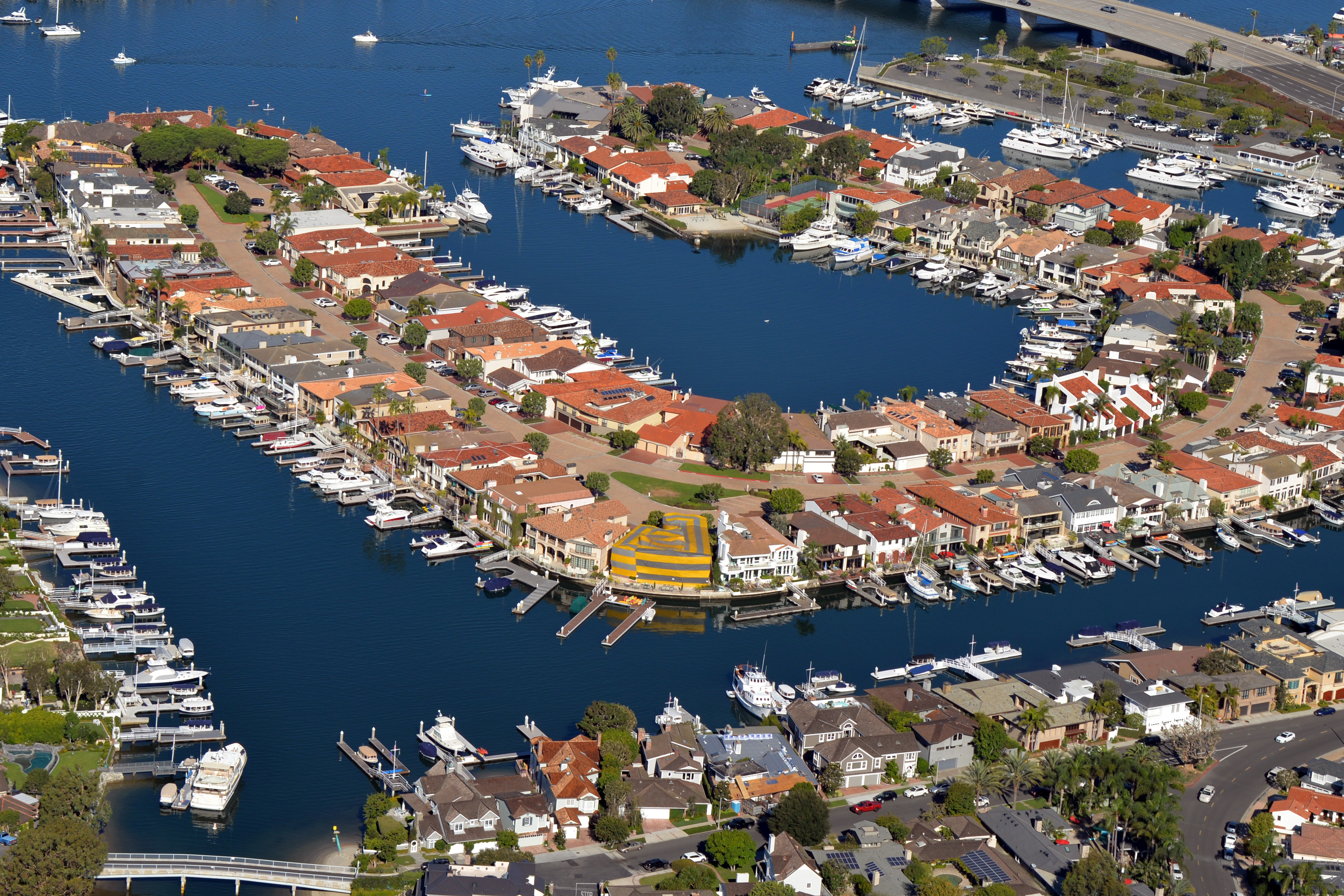
Linda Island, Newport Beach

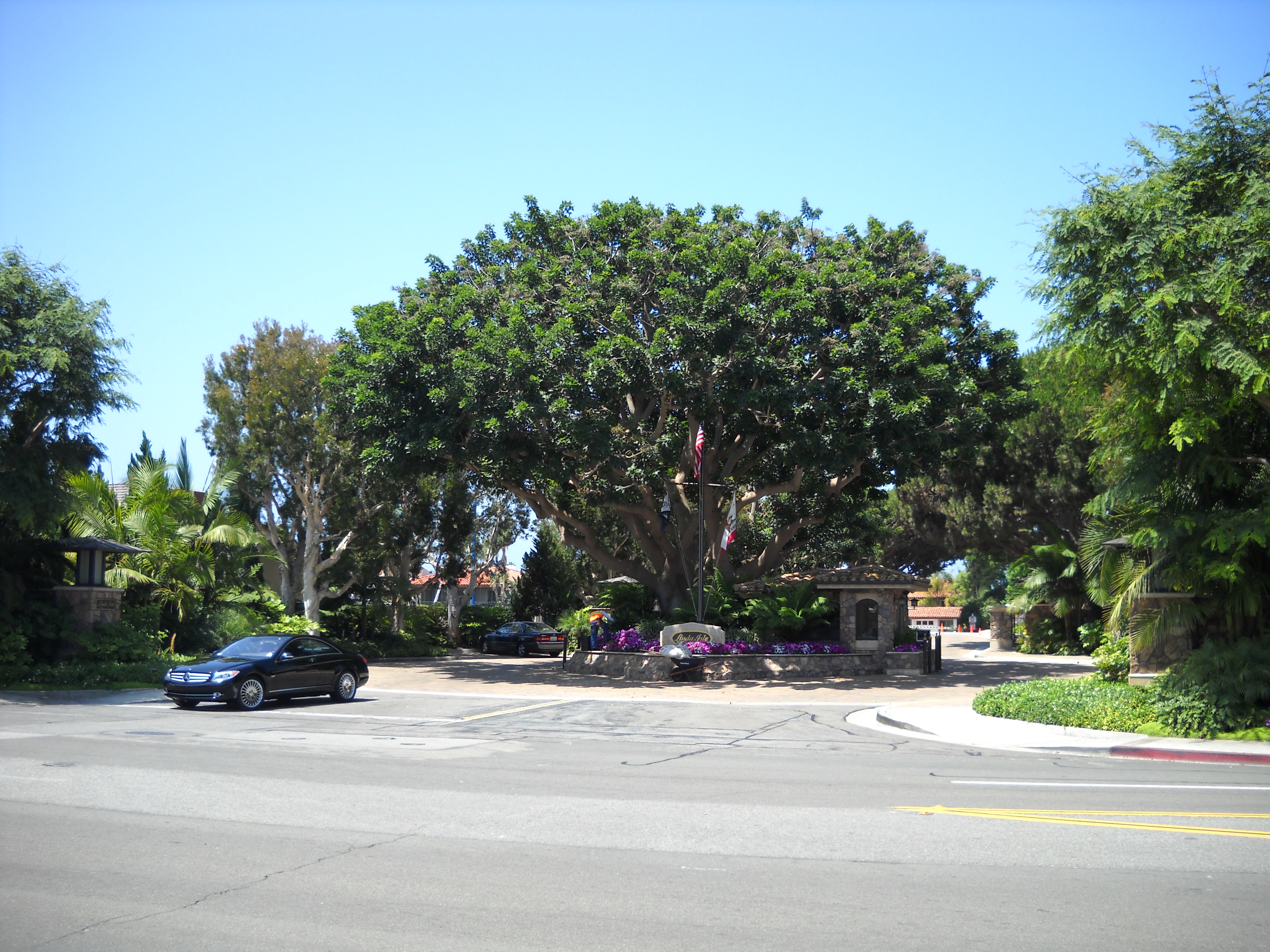
Linda Island, street view

Linda Isle is a part of the Lower Bay of Newport Beach, California. In 1954, Linda Isle became the last island to be incorporated into the city of Newport Beach, and it was in this period that the entire city, including the islands, began to change from a resort to a residential community. Linda Island is laid out in the shape of a horseshoe, and each home has its own dock. The island is not accessible to the public.

Notable early residents included Gary Primm, along with his yacht the "Prima Donna", which was a notable fixture for many years. Other notable Linda Island residents also included Todd "Doc" Raleigh.

== See also ==
- History of Newport Beach
- Balboa Island
- List of islands of California
