= Dairyville, California =

Unincorporated community in California, United States

- Unincorporated community
- Location within California Location within the United States
- Coordinates: 40°07′48″N 122°07′16″W
- Country: United States
- State: California
- County: Tehama
- Elevation: 246 ft (75 m)
- Time zone: UTC-8 (Pacific (PST))
  - Summer (DST): UTC-7 (PDT)
- Area code: 530
- GNIS feature ID: 1658367

Dairyville is an unincorporated community in Tehama County, California, United States. The community is along the Sacramento River and California State Route 99, 7 miles (11 km) east-southeast of Red Bluff.
