= Bay Island (Newport Beach, California) =

Island in Newport Beach, California

Coordinates: 33°36′25″N 117°54′18″W

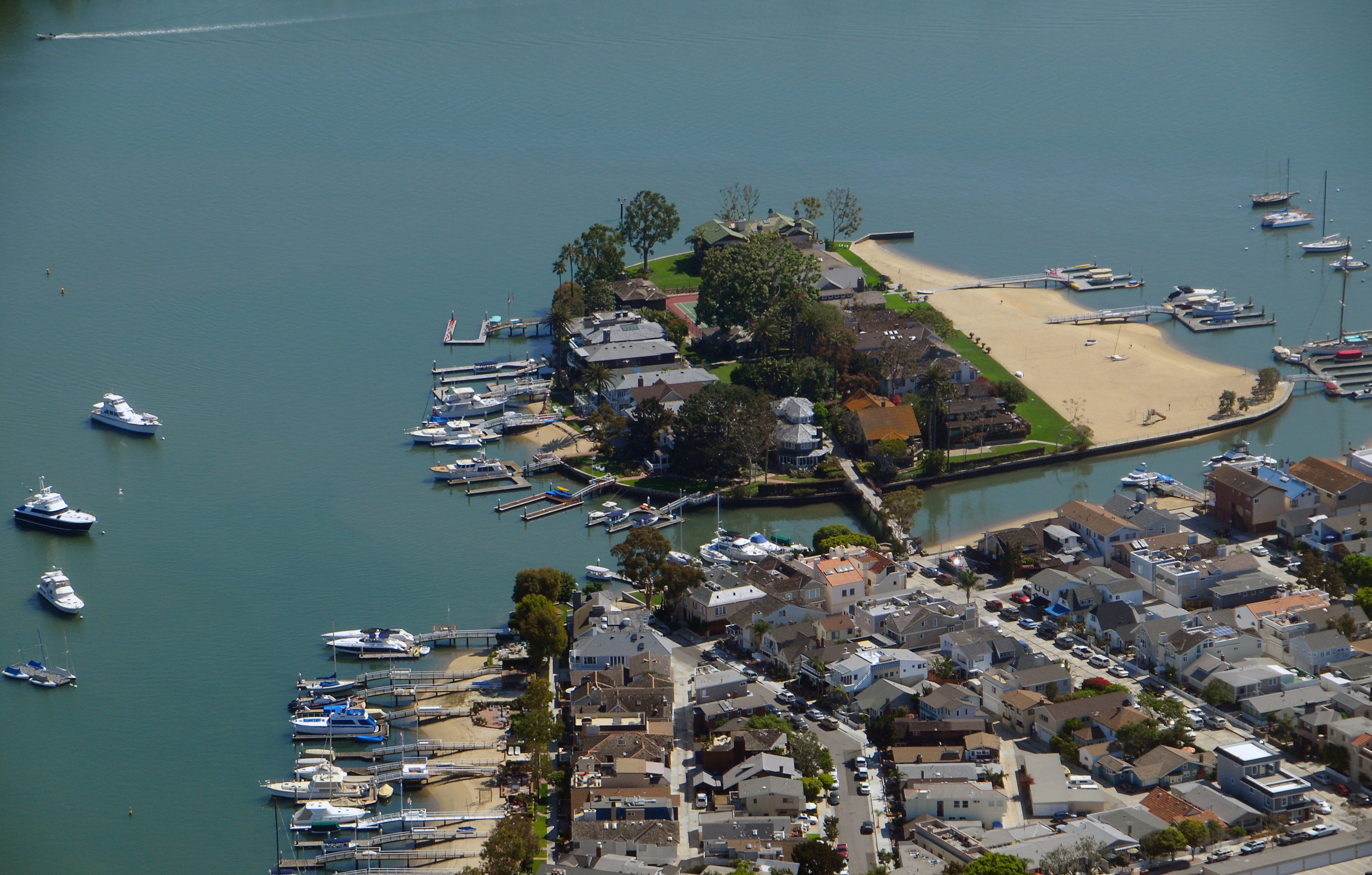
Bay Island January 2013

Bay Island is a small island located halfway down Balboa Peninsula in Newport Beach, California. It is the only island in the Newport Beach harbor islands that does not allow car traffic. The island is accessible via a small bridge that will only accommodate golf carts. The island is not accessible to the public by land, though public access to its beaches is protected by the California Constitution. It has 23 residences, a botanical garden, courtyard garden, tennis court, and several beaches.

== Notable natives and residents ==
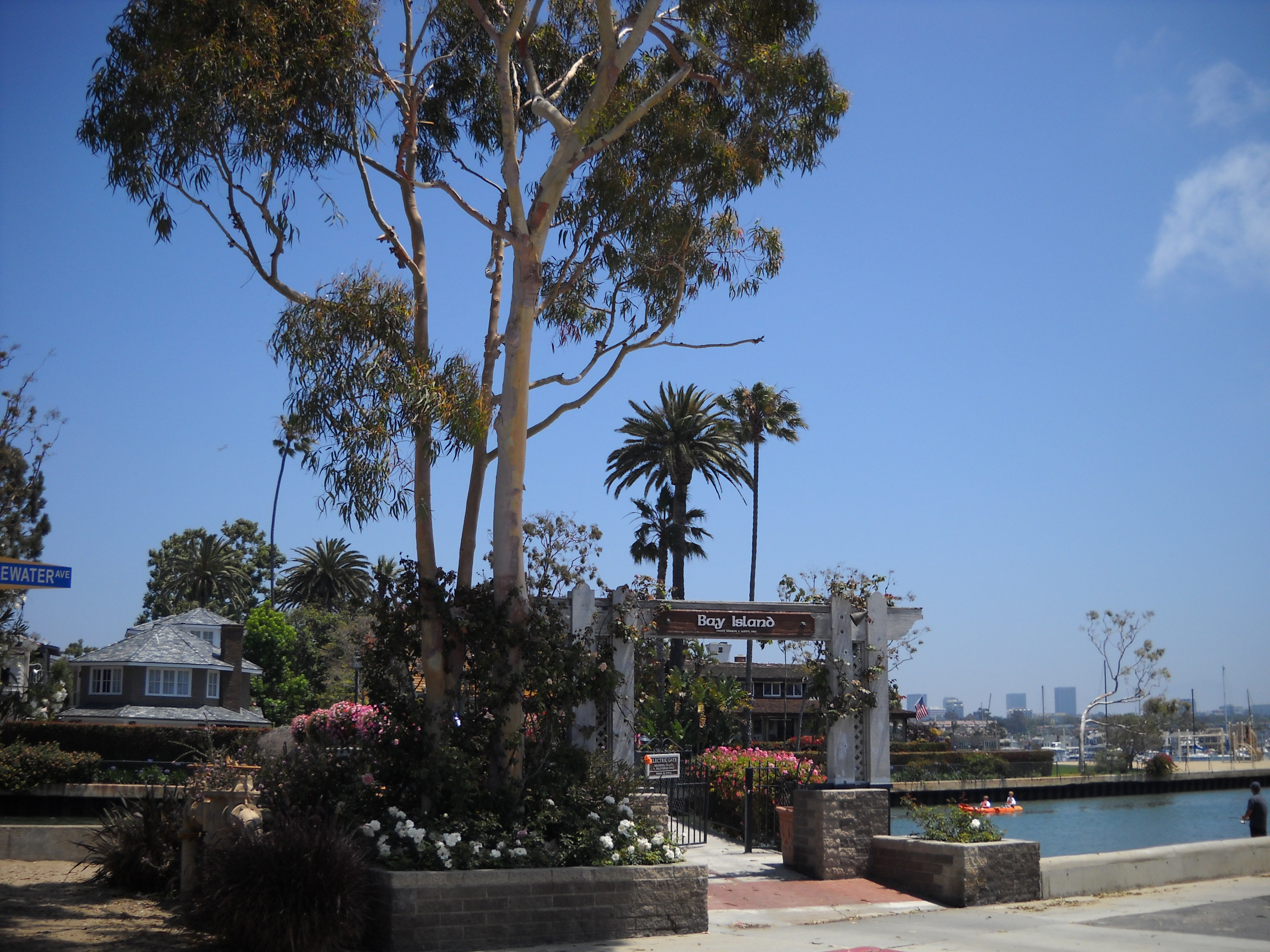
Bay Island

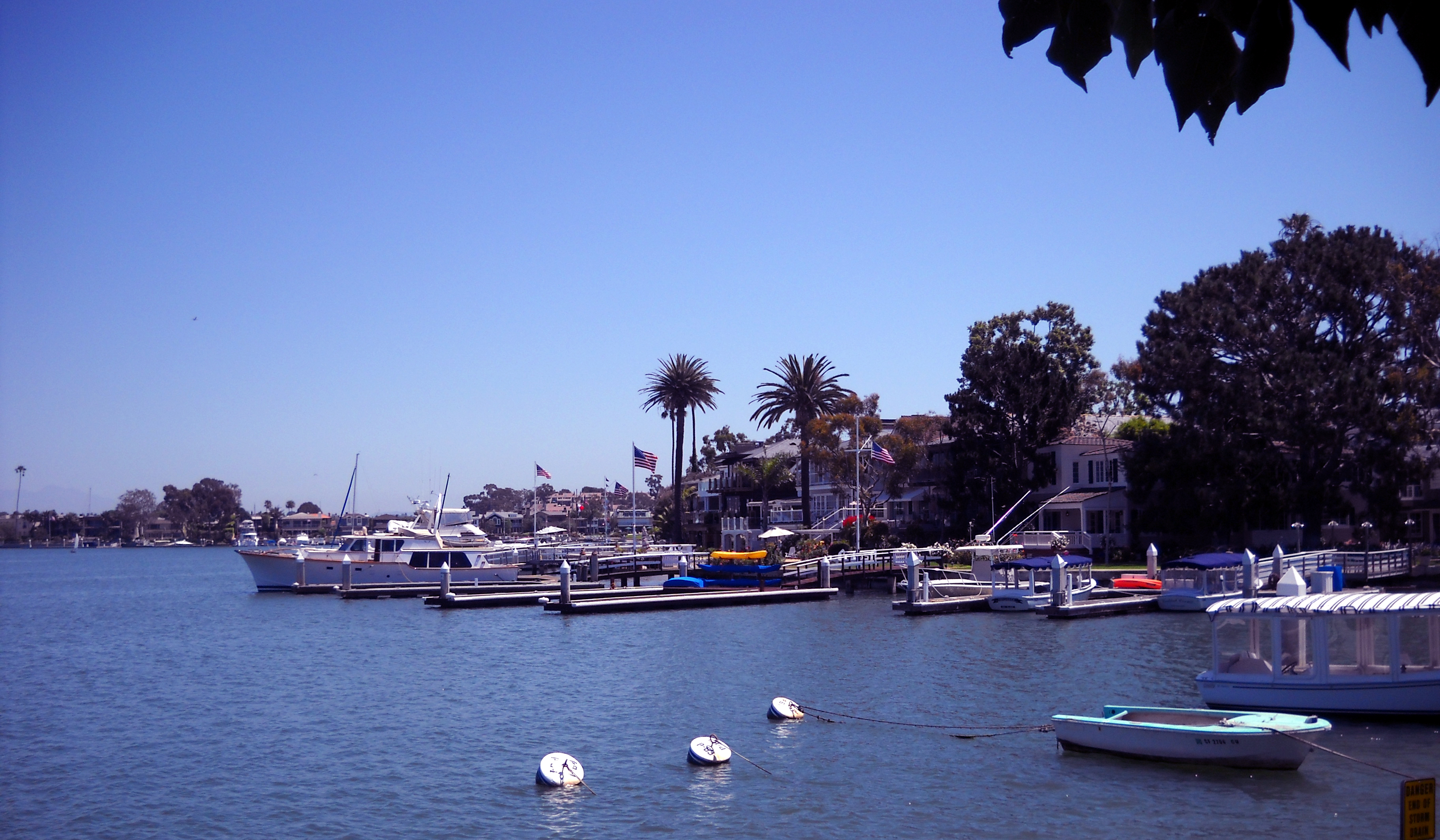
Bay Island

Bay Island is Newport Harbor's only natural island. Although not underwater, it was a mud flat with one small hill of dry land when R. J. Waters and Rufus Sanborn (Vice President of the Citizens National Bank of Los Angeles) bought it in 1904 for $350. They recognized good duck hunting there and organized a gun club. Sanborn built a small shack on the dry hill and welcomed hunters. Although at first, hunters could only arrive at low tide, it was not long until a walk on pilings was constructed. It was so popular the first year that, by the second year, a poker club was added and women were invited.

By 1907, Sanborn had built a home. Also in 1907, Sam Tustin (Son of Columbus Tustin, the founder of Tustin) had built a home nearby, but he sold it almost immediately to Madame Helena Modjeska. Although she only owned it for a short while, she was Bay Island's most notable resident. Her acting talents were noted early and, as a young woman, she was placed under a life contract with the Imperial Theatre of Warsaw. Her fame, plus a fast-paced life and some personal losses, resulted in her collapse and the decision to immigrate to the United States to try communal farming in Anaheim. Although farming was a disaster, America welcomed her and she was soon a beloved stage star. Just before her death in 1909, she bought Tustin's home on Bay Island. As Orange County's first rich famous resident, Bay Island was temporarily renamed in her honor.

Notable residents included actress Helena Modjeska, H.R. Haldeman and Otis Chandler.

== See also ==
- History of Newport Beach
- Balboa Island
- List of islands of California
