= Corinthian Island =

Island in California

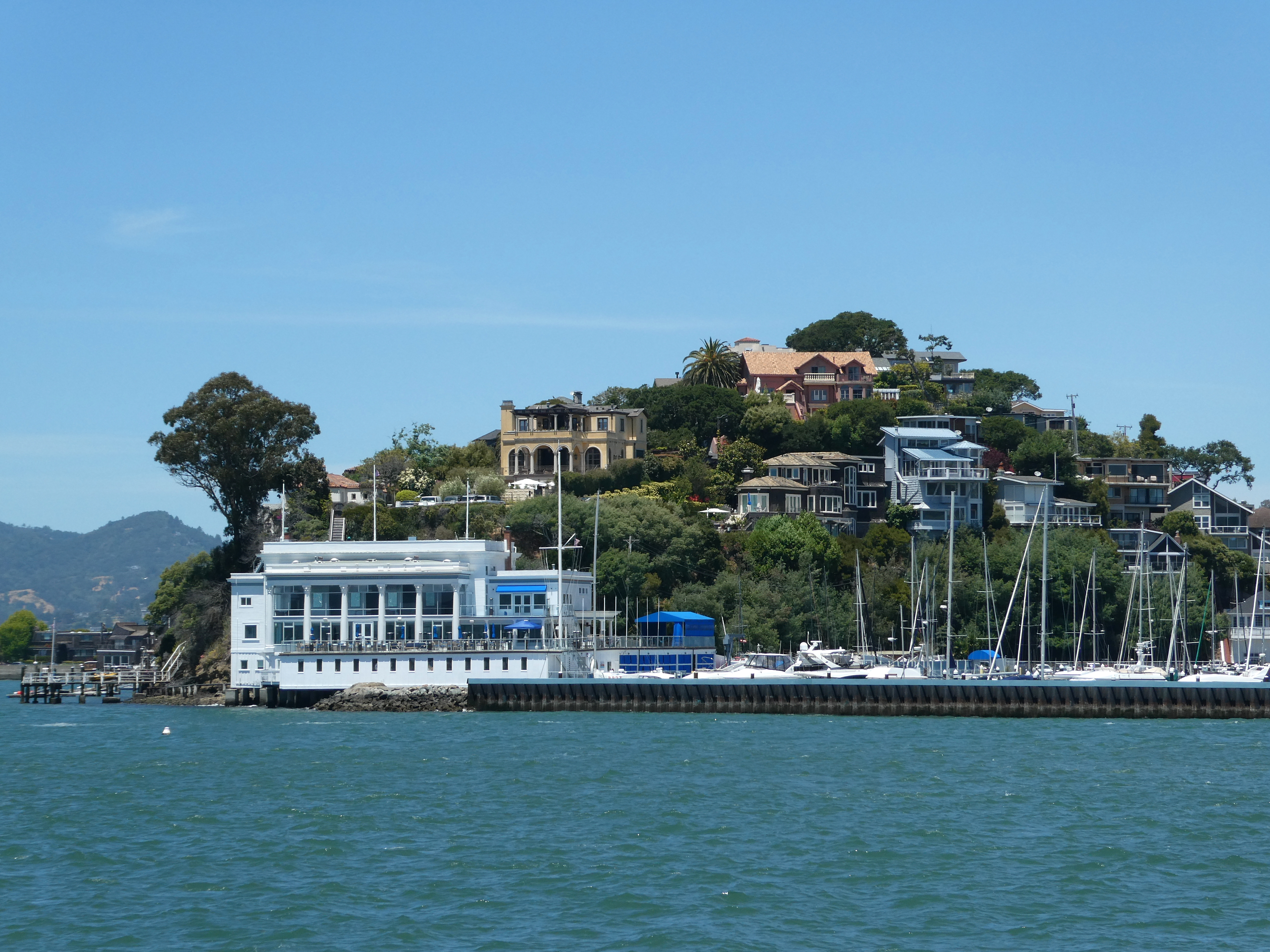
- Corinthian Island in June 2024

- Location within San Francisco Bay Area Location within California Location within the United States

Geography
- Location: Northern California
- Coordinates: 37°52′22″N 122°27′32″W
- Adjacent to: Sacramento–San Joaquin River Delta
- Highest elevation: 72 ft (21.9 m)

Administration
- United States
- State: California
- County: Marin

Corinthian Island is a former island in the San Francisco Bay, that was later attached to the mainland. It is in Marin County, California, by the Tiburon Peninsula. Its coordinates are 37°52′22″N 122°27′32″W, and the United States Geological Survey gave its elevation as 72 ft (22 m) in 1981. It appears on a 1950 USGS map of the area.
