= Rat Rock (California) =

Island in California

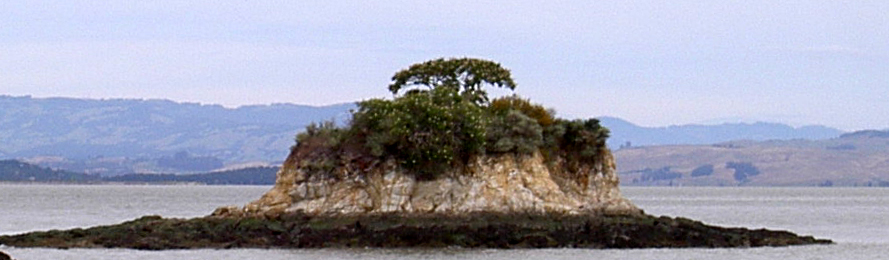
- Rat Rock, as seen looking north from China Camp in May 2010.

- Location within San Francisco Bay Area Location within California Location within the United States

Geography
- Location: Northern California
- Coordinates: 38°00′16″N 122°27′43″W
- Highest elevation: 18 ft (5.5 m)

Administration
- United States
- State: California
- County: Marin

Rat Rock is an uninhabited, 18-foot (5.5 m) tall rock island in the San Francisco Bay, located just north of China Camp. It serves to protect part of the beach at China Camp from winds which come from the northwest. It appears on a 2015 United States Geological Survey map of the area.
