= Smith Island (California) =

Island in California, USA

Coordinates: 35°09′46″N 120°45′17″W

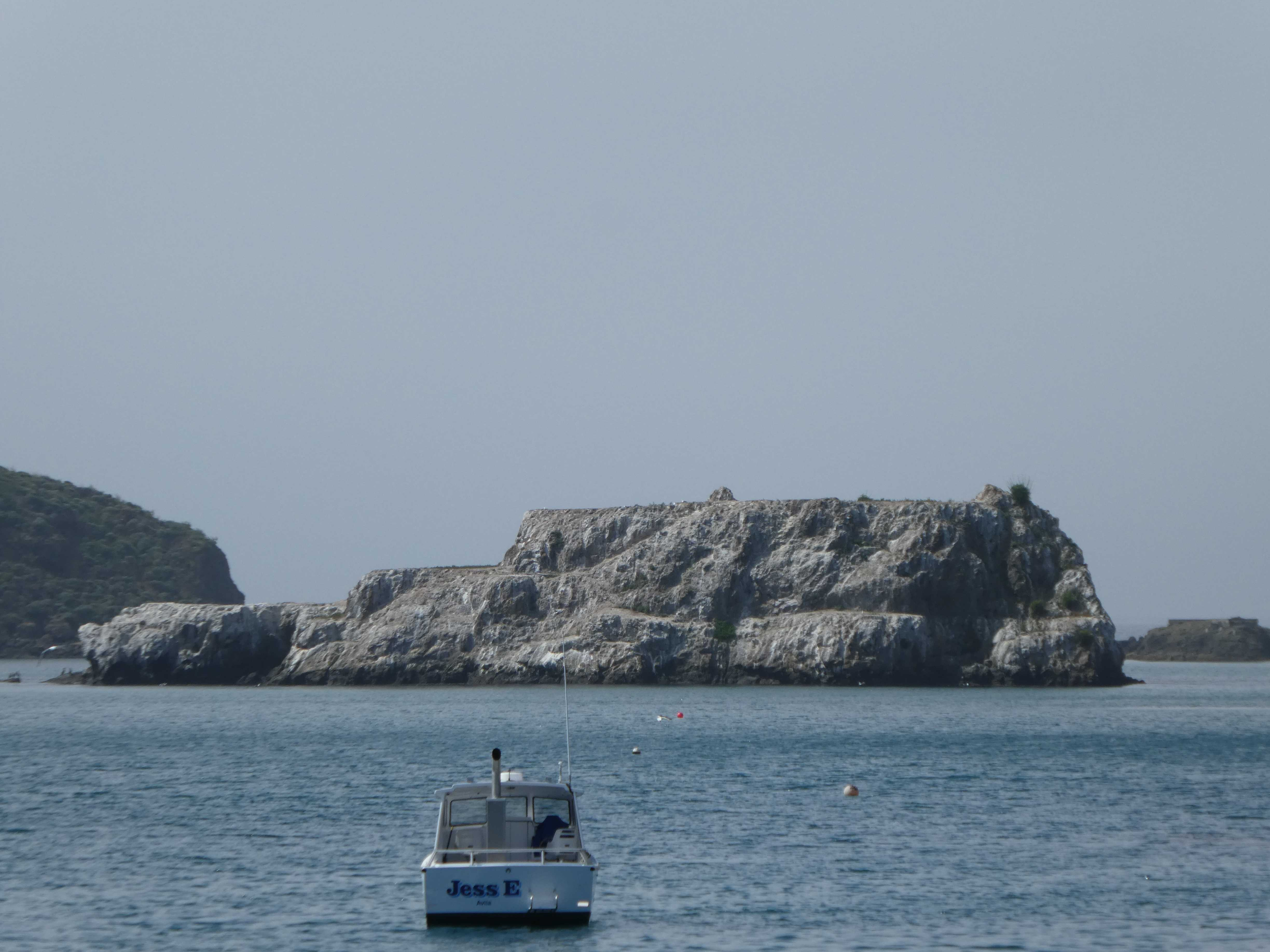
Smith Island from Harford Pier

Smith Island is a small rocky island near Avila Beach, California. It was settled in the late 19th century and is currently uninhabited. The island is near the former settlement of Port Harford, California.
