= Point Buckler Island =

Island in California, United States

Coordinates: 38.096°N 122.016°W

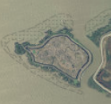

Point Buckler Island is an uninhabited island in Solano County, California, United States. It is a marshy island in the San Francisco Bay, with an area of 39 acres (16 ha) or 50 acres (20 ha). It is part of Suisun Marsh and is located east of the Carquinez Strait.

The island and surrounding area are a habitat for animals including the delta smelt and Chinook salmon. It has a bar and lounge, two helipads, and a deep-water dock. It has repeatedly had problems with levee maintenance.

The John Muir Land Trust bought the island in 2025 and intends to restore it to its natural state.

== History ==
The island's first owner has been claimed to be construction businessperson Gaetano Seeno. The origin of its name is unknown.

John Sweeney bought Point Buckler Island in 2011 for $150,000 and ran a kiteboarding club and a duck hunting club on it. According to Sweeney, he transferred the island's ownership to Point Buckler Island LLC in 2015. In 2023, he listed it for sale for $75 million.

Sweeney carried out work on the island to repair or build levees, leading to disputes with regulators and claims of environmental harm. San Francisco Bay Regional Water Quality Control Board ordered him to remove a levee in 2016, and the Environmental Protection Agency said that he had violated the Clean Water Act. He was issued fines of $2.8 million. Amid the legal disputes, the island was sold at auction to the nonprofit John Muir Land Trust for $3.8 million on 22 January 2025. In accordance with the court-imposed conditions of the sale, the organization announced plans to restore the island to its natural state, at an expected cost of approximately $3.5 million.

== Condition ==
Point Buckler Island is ecologically important because it is located at the brackish transition point between the San Joaquin River Delta and the San Francisco Bay. The island's levees have dried it out, which has been bad for birds and fish according to environmentalists. The John Muir Land Trust has said that salmon are sometimes stranded after washing over the levees.

Former owner John Sweeney and government officials disagree about the history of the island's condition. Officials have stated that the island's wetland environment began to return in the early 21st century as levees deteriorated, only for Sweeney's development after 2011 to interfere with water flow again. Sweeney has said that the island did not return to a wetland state during this period.

The John Muir Land Trust plans to remove human-made debris from the island, plant native vegetation, and restore natural water flows.
