= Quimby Island =

Island in California

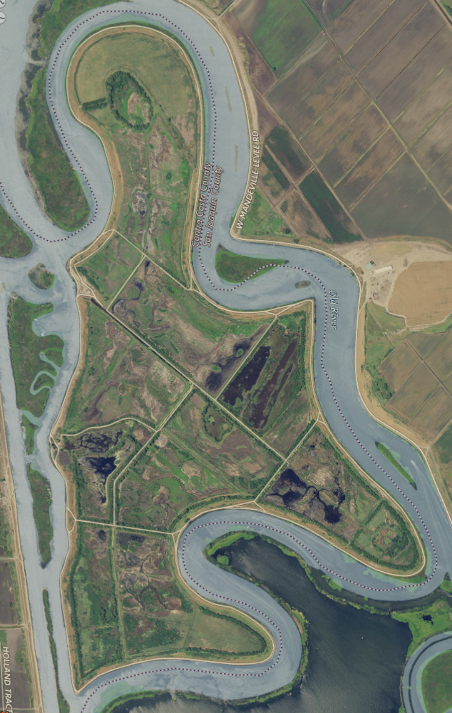
- USGS aerial imagery of the island.

- Location within Sacramento-San Joaquin River Delta Location within California Location within the United States

Geography
- Location: Northern California
- Coordinates: 38.0251993°N 121.5713413°W
- Adjacent to: Sacramento–San Joaquin River Delta
- Area: 789 acres (319 ha)
- Length: 2.25 mi (3.62 km)
- Highest elevation: −10 ft (-3 m)

Administration
- United States
- State: California
- County: Contra Costa

Quimby Island is a small island in the Sacramento–San Joaquin River Delta, whose coordinates are 38.0251993°N 121.5713413°W. It is in Contra Costa County, and managed by Reclamation District 2090.
