= Ogilvie Island =

Island in California

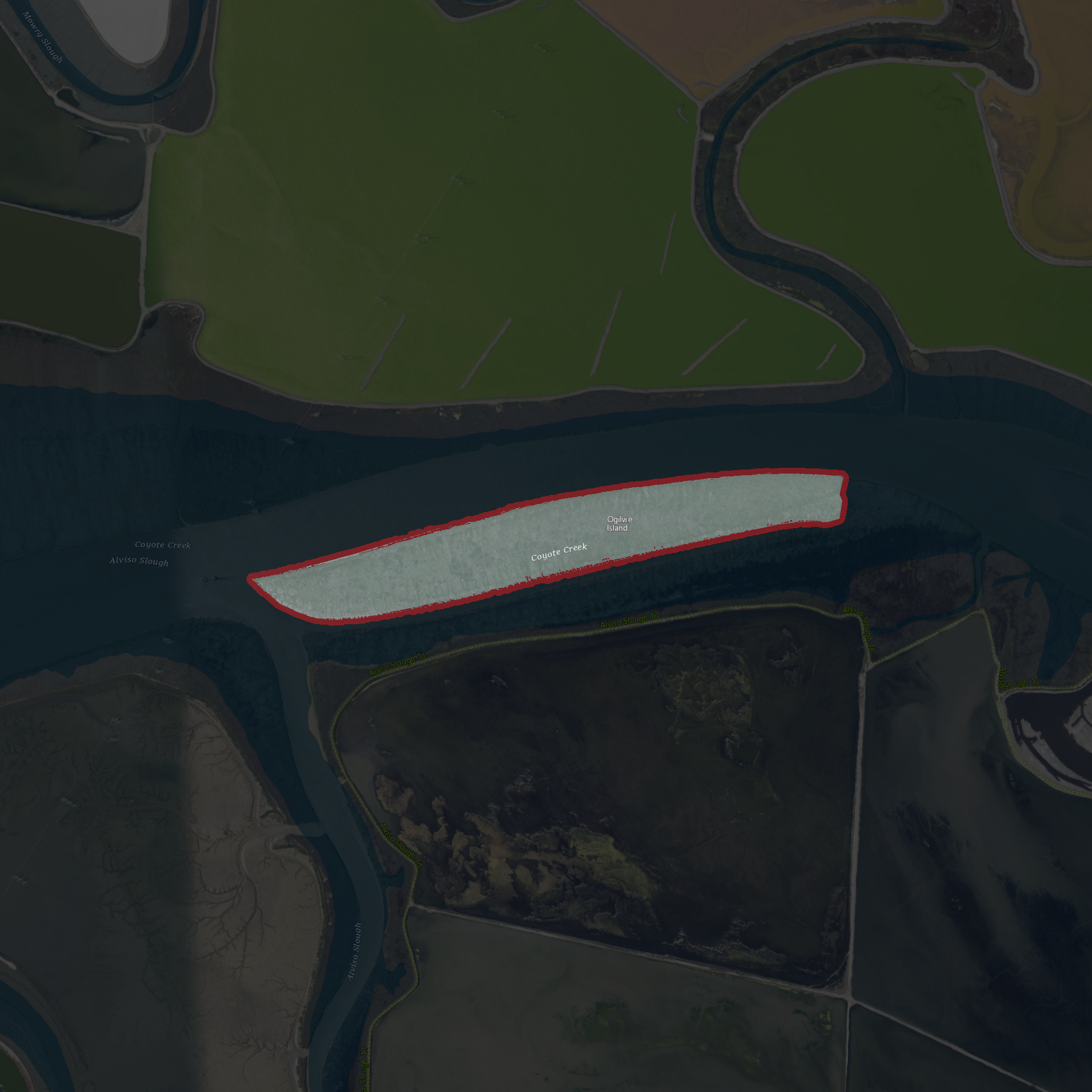
- USGS aerial imagery of Ogilvie Island

- Location within San Francisco Bay Area Location within California Location within the United States

Geography
- Location: Northern California
- Coordinates: 37°27′55″N 122°00′37″W
- Adjacent to: San Francisco Bay
- Highest elevation: 0 ft (0 m)

Administration
- United States
- State: California
- County: Santa Clara
- City: San Jose

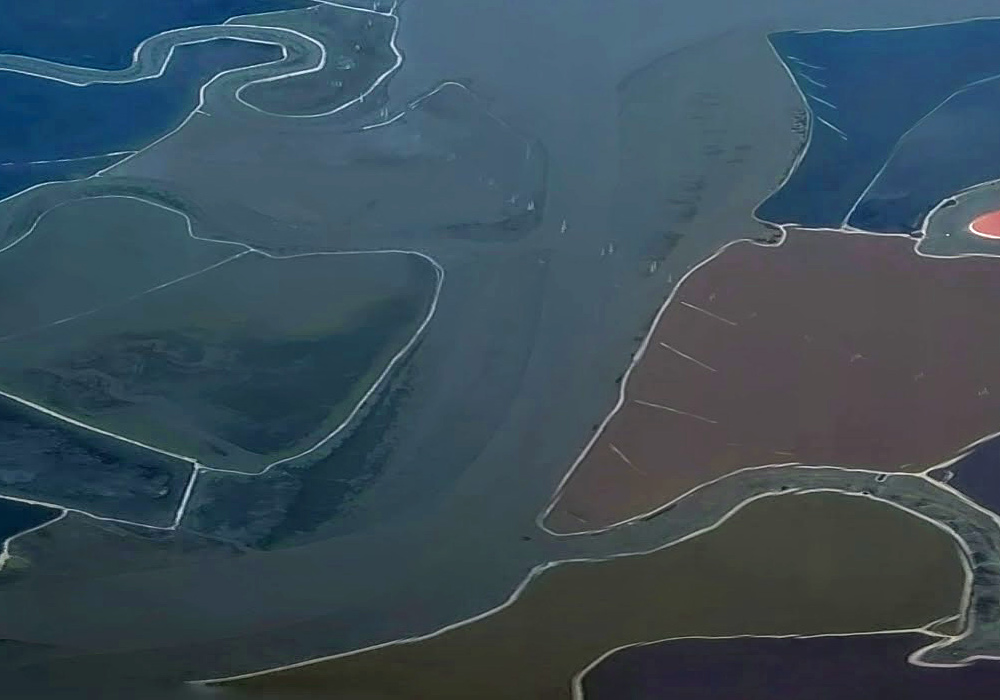
Ogilvie Island (at center) mostly submerged by water, as seen from the northeast in a 2019 aerial photo

Ogilvie Island is a patch of mud in San Francisco Bay. It is within the limits of the city of San Jose, in Santa Clara County, California, and named for county planner Arthur Ogilvie. Its coordinates are 37°27′55″N 122°00′37″W, and the United States Geological Survey gave its elevation as 0 ft (0 m) in 2012. It appears on a 2012 USGS map of the area.
