= Holland Tract =

Island in California

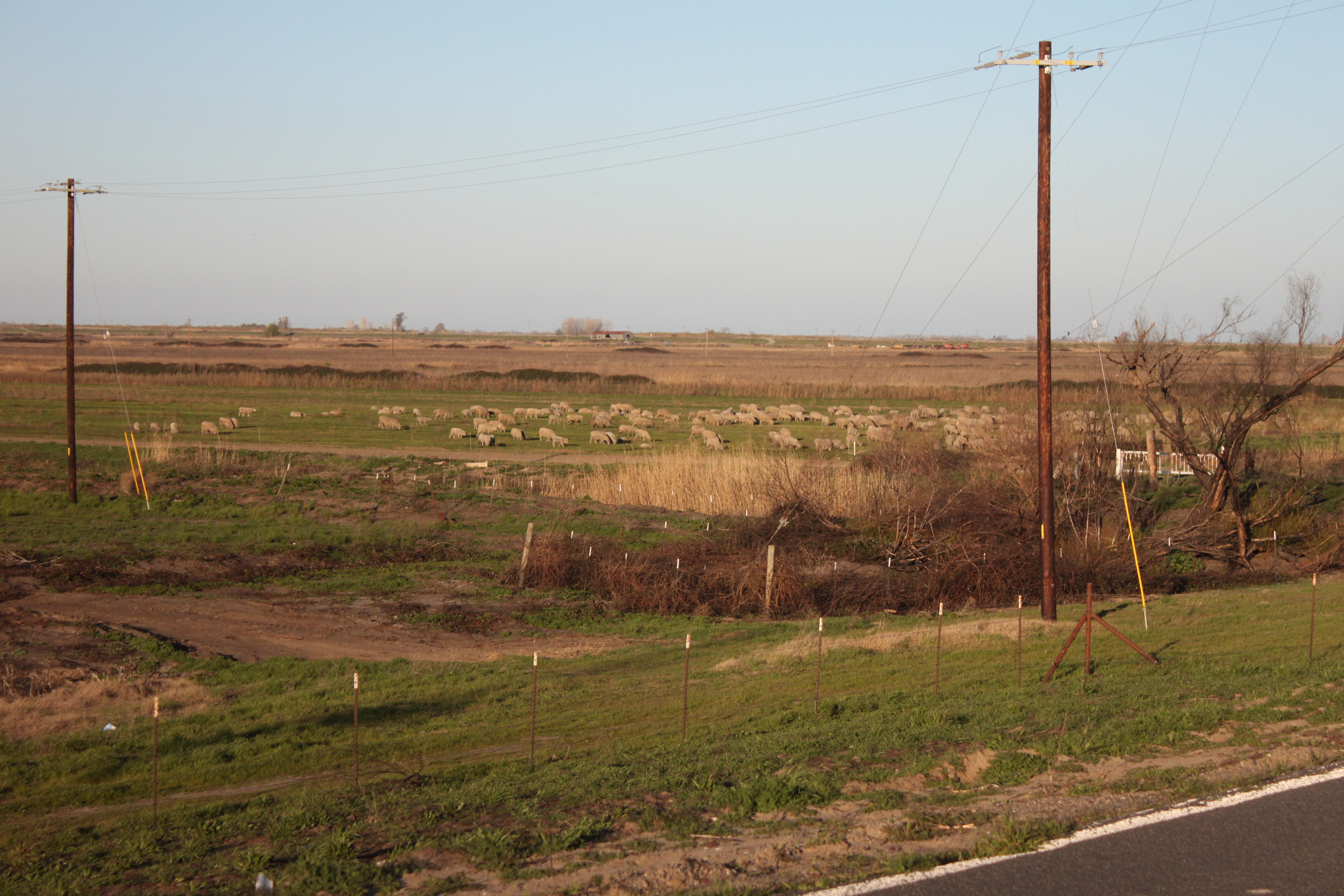
- Sheep roaming the Holland Tract in 2021.

- Location within Sacramento-San Joaquin River Delta Location within California Location within the United States

Geography
- Location: Northern California
- Coordinates: 37°59′55″N 121°36′08″W
- Adjacent to: Sacramento–San Joaquin River Delta
- Highest elevation: 7 ft (2.1 m)

Administration
- United States
- State: California
- County: Contra Costa

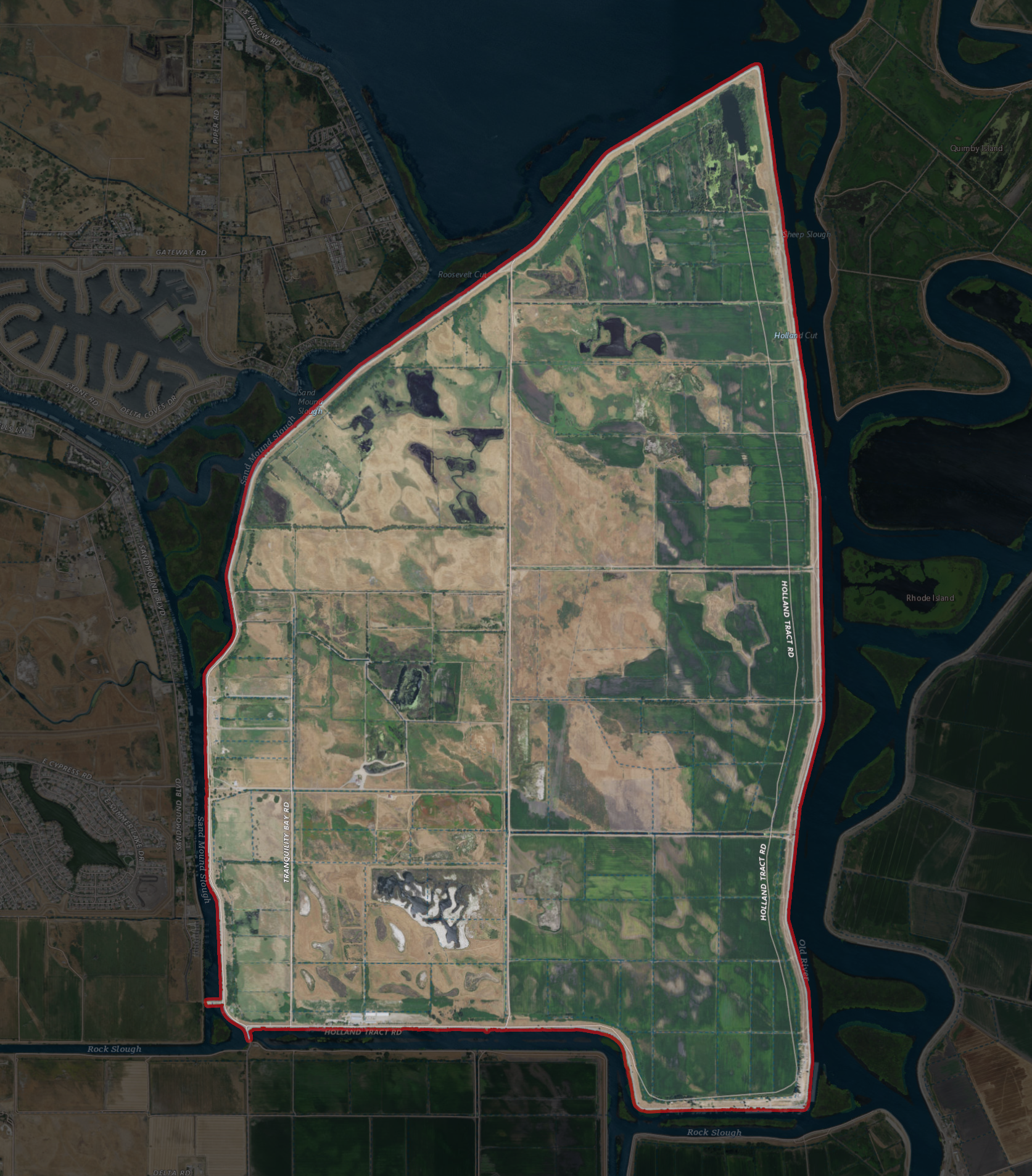
USGS aerial imagery of Holland Tract

The Holland Tract is an island in the Sacramento–San Joaquin River Delta. It is part of Contra Costa County, California, and managed by Reclamation District 2025. Its coordinates are 37°59′55″N 121°36′08″W, and the United States Geological Survey measured its elevation as 7 ft (2.1 m) in 1981. It appears on a 1952 United States Geological Survey map of the area.
