= Newport Heights, Newport Beach =

Coordinates: 33°37′09″N 117°55′24″W

Newport Heights is a neighborhood located in Newport Beach, California. Its general borders are Pacific Coast Highway, Dover Drive, 16th Street, and Newport Blvd.

The primary zip code is 92663.

Newport Heights is known for its views as it sits on a cliff up above PCH looking down at Mariners Mile.
