= Harbor Island, Newport Beach =

Artificial island in Newport Bay, California

Harbor Island
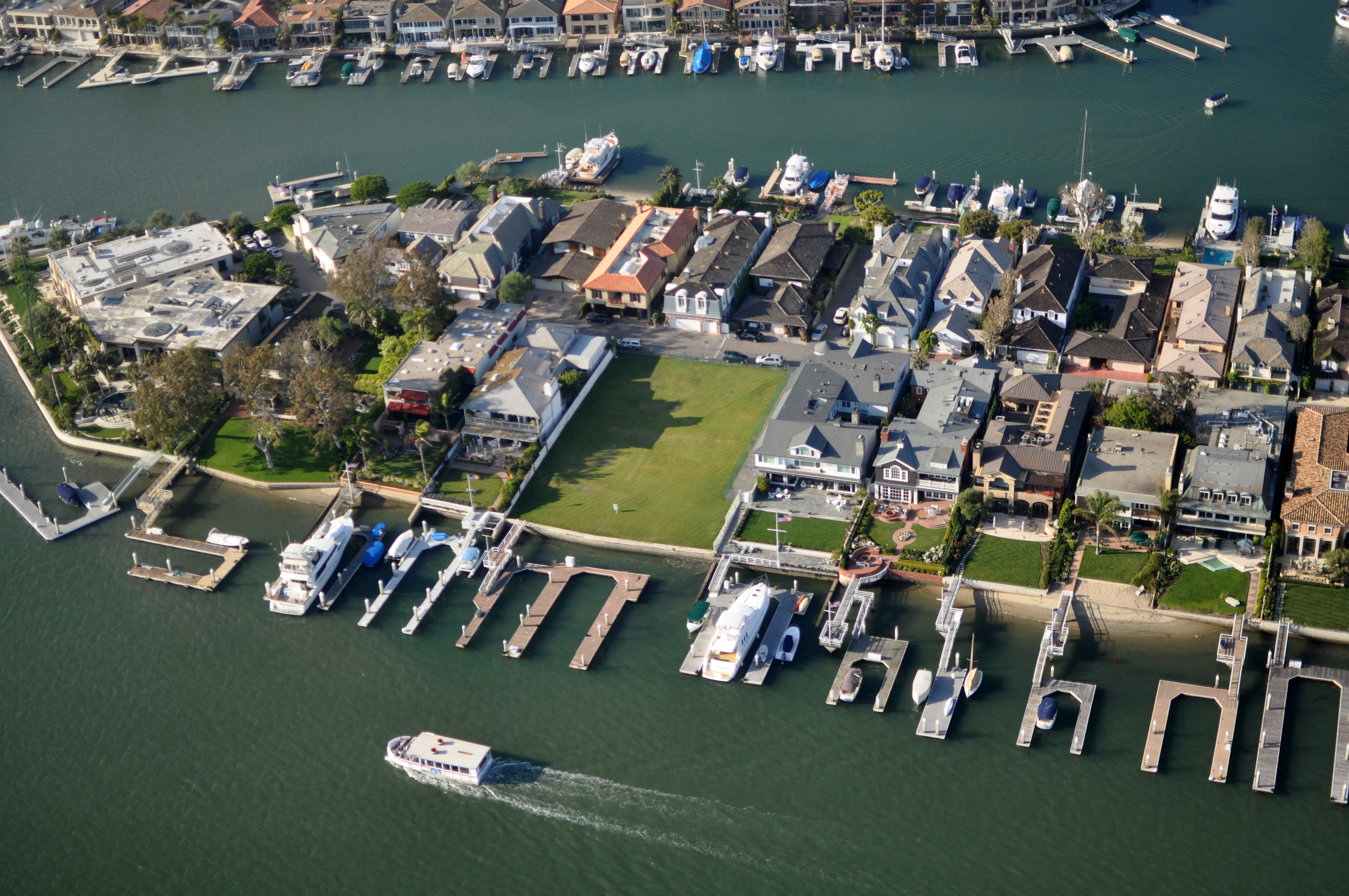
- Aerial view of Harbor Island

- Location within the Los Angeles metropolitan area Location within California

Geography
- Location: Newport Bay
- Coordinates: 33°36′38″N 117°54′10″W
- Adjacent to: Pacific Ocean
- Area: 9.5 acres (3.8 ha)

Administration
- United States

Additional information
- Time zone: UTC-8
  - Summer (DST): UTC-7 (UTC)

Harbor Island is a small artificial island in Newport Beach, California. Newport Harbor is a semi-artificial harbor that was formed by dredging an estuary during the early 1900s. Several artificial islands were built, including Harbor Island, now covered with about thirty private homes. It is a gated community and is home to many very expensive homes. Every home is along one street, Harbor Island Road, and each plot has waterfront access with one or more boat docks. Notable residents include George Argyros, Donald Bren, and Bill Gross.

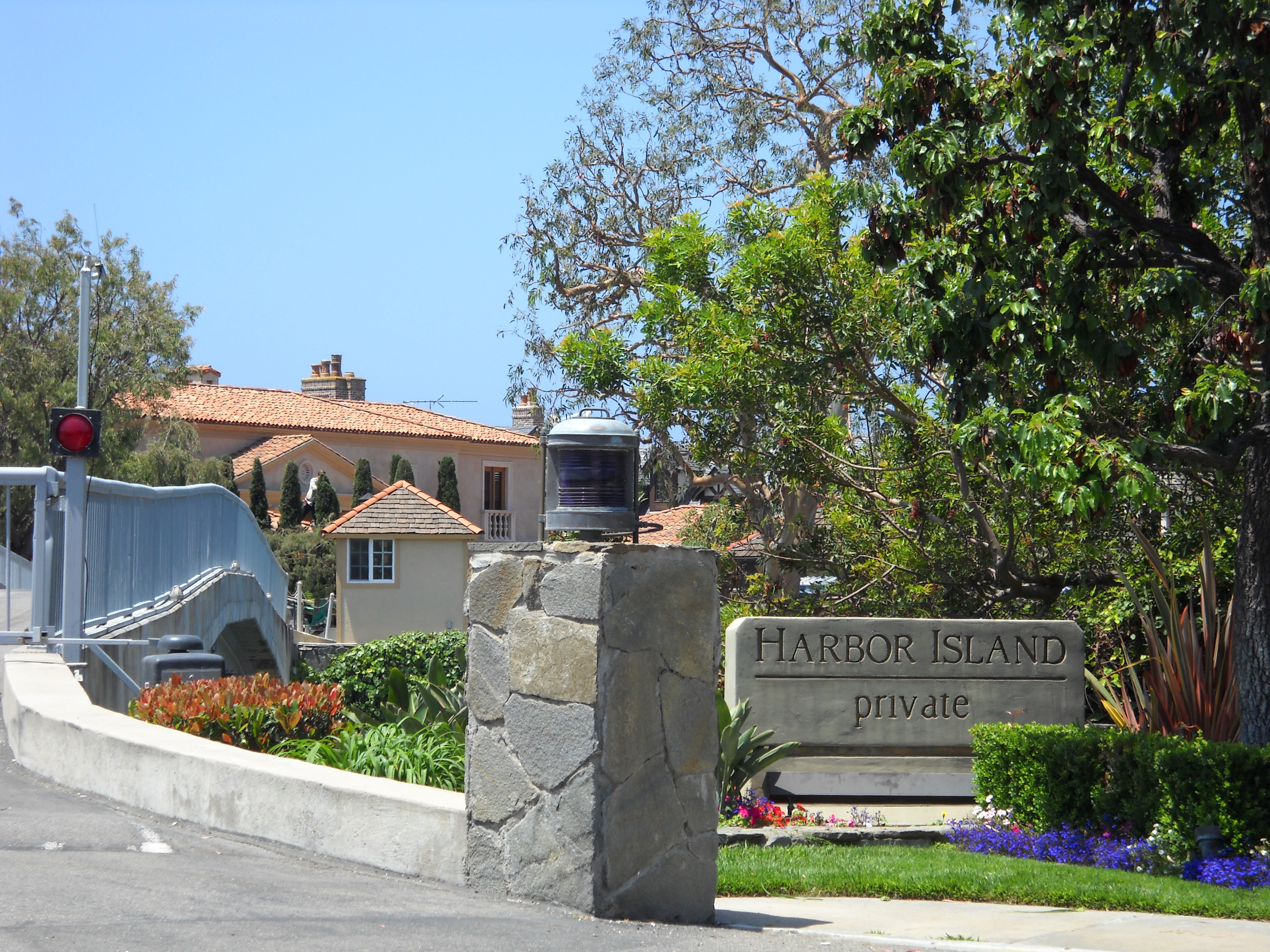
Harbor Island viewed from Beacon Bay. The gated bridge to the island can be seen on the left.

== See also ==
- History of Newport Beach
- Balboa Island
- List of islands of California
