= Little Mandeville Island =

Island in California

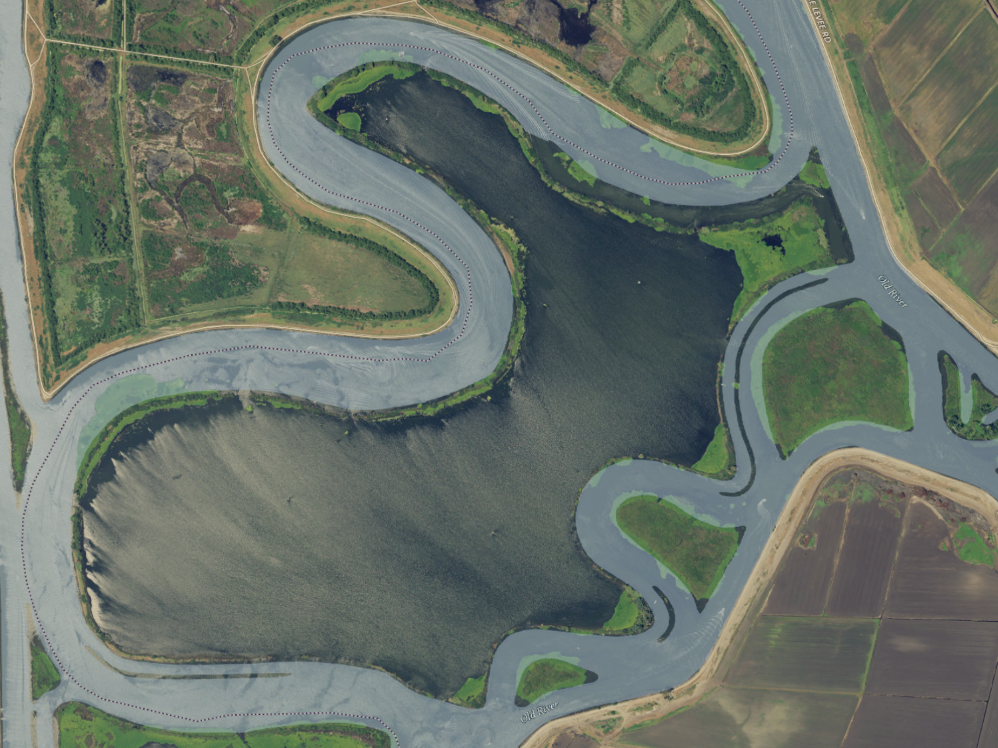

- Location within Sacramento-San Joaquin River Delta Location within California Location within the United States

Geography
- Location: Northern California
- Coordinates: 38.0104776°N 121.5649522°W
- Adjacent to: Sacramento–San Joaquin River Delta

Administration
- United States
- State: California
- County: San Joaquin

Little Mandeville Island is a small, mostly submerged island in the San Joaquin River delta, in California. It is part of San Joaquin County, and its coordinates are 38.0104776°N 121.5649522°W. In 1994, 376 acres (152 ha) of former farmland was inundated with water after a levee broke.
