= Old River (California) =

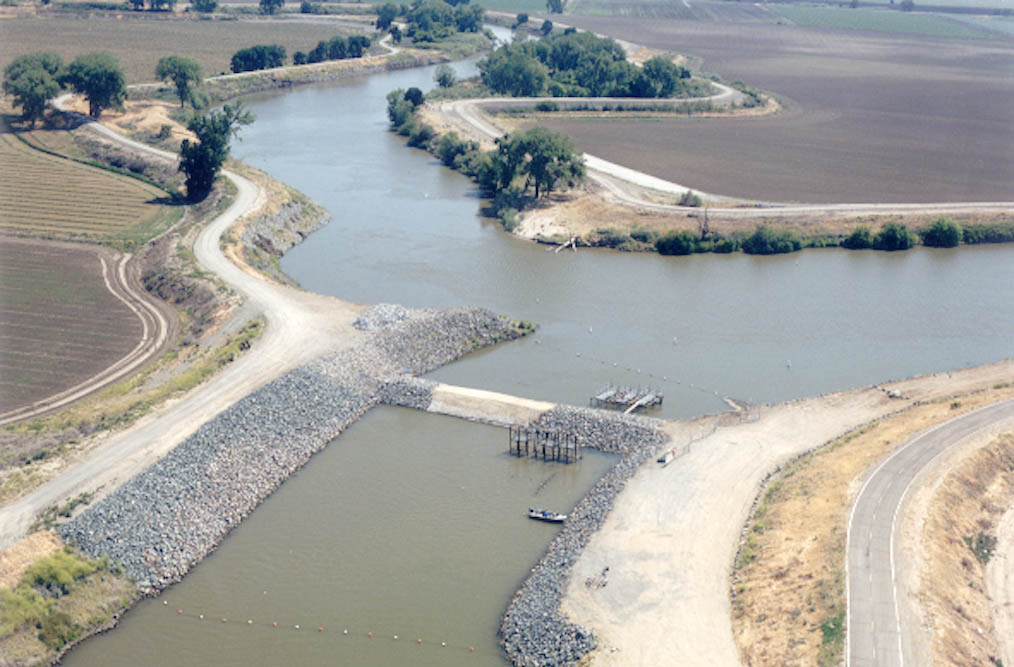
- Old River (below) at upper confluence with San Joaquin River near Tracy

- Location within Sacramento-San Joaquin River Delta Location within California Location within the United States

Location
- Country: United States
- State: California

Physical characteristics
- Source
  - location: San Joaquin River Lathrop
  - coordinates: 37°48′29″N 121°19′38″W
  - elevation: 11 ft (3.4 m)
- Mouth
  - location: San Joaquin River near Terminous
  - coordinates: 38°04′21″N 121°34′15″W
  - elevation: Sea level
- Length: 40 mi (64 km)

The Old River is a tidal distributary of the San Joaquin River that flows for about 40 miles (64 km) through the Sacramento–San Joaquin River Delta in Northern California. The Old River was once the main channel of the San Joaquin until navigation (Stockton Deepwater Shipping Channel) and flood control projects in the late 19th and 20th century fixed the San Joaquin to its present course past Stockton. It diverges from the San Joaquin near Tracy, about 38 miles (61 km) upstream from Antioch, and first runs west towards Mountain House, then north to rejoin the San Joaquin 13 miles (21 km) above Antioch. The river is lined with levees that prevent flooding of the adjacent Delta islands, many of which lie below sea level. The Middle River runs east of and roughly parallel to Old River. False River diverges from Old River about a mile (1.6 km) above the Old River's mouth and runs westward to join the San Joaquin at a point closer to Antioch. Part of the Old River forms the boundary between San Joaquin County on the east and Contra Costa County to the west.

About halfway along its course the Old River passes by the Clifton Court Forebay, where water is pumped from the Delta to support California's two primary water supply systems, the Central Valley Project and State Water Project. Because both projects derive their sources from the Sacramento River further north, pumping results in a reverse flow in the Old River as water flowing through the Delta Cross Channel is drawn southward through the Delta and up the Old River. (Naturally, the Old River would have flowed in a northerly direction). During dry summers, this often results in saltwater intrusion from San Francisco Bay. The reverse flow also confuses migrating salmon in the San Joaquin River which may have contributed to the decline of the species in the 20th century. Since the 1960s, the California Department of Water Resources has maintained temporary barrier dams to control the flow of water, a system which has improved water quality and circulation. The Head of Old River barrier is routinely installed during spring at the point where the Old River diverges from the San Joaquin, in order to prevent outmigrating young salmon from entering the longer, winding Old River where they are less likely to survive the journey to the sea.

A pumping station on Old River east of Discovery Bay provides fresh water to Los Vaqueros Reservoir via pipeline.

The Peripheral Canal project, proposed since the 1960s would have bypassed diverted water flows around the Delta and eliminated the reverse flow in the Old River. However, the canal was never built due to environmental concerns for the Delta region.

On the right bank, the Old River borders Berts Island, Union Island, Victoria Island, Woodward Island, Bacon Island, and Mandeville Island. On the left it borders Stewart Tract, Coney Island, Widdows Island, Byron Tract, Orwood Tract, Palm Tract, Holland Tract, Little Mandeville Island, Quimby Island, and Webb Tract. The Old River also skirts the Franks Tract State Recreation Area, a former Delta island that is now submerged and forms a lake.

The Old River ranges from 5 to 10 feet (1.5 to 3.0 m) deep and from 150 to 1,600 feet (46 to 488 m) wide.

The U.S. Geological Survey operates five stream gauges on the Old River. Measured at Bacon Island, the Old River had an average reverse flow of 1,823.6 cubic feet per second (51.64 m^{3}/s) between 2006 and 2014.

== See also ==
- List of rivers of California
