= Reclamation district =

Reclamation districts are a form of special-purpose districts in the United States (and possibly other countries) which are responsible for reclaiming and/or maintaining land that is threatened by permanent or temporary flooding for agricultural, residential, commercial, or industrial use. The land is reclaimed by removing and/or preventing water from returning via systems of levees, dikes, drainage ditches, and pumps.

== In the United States ==
Many American reclamation districts were established prior to 1900, when local land owners first started working to put new land into agricultural production. Much of the lands "reclaimed" by 19th century reclamation districts were natural wetlands. Since wetlands are subject to flooding, these lands often were adjacent to sources of water, making them ideal for growing irrigated crops. Furthermore, the soils of wetlands also proved to be excellent for crops.

Though the original use of most of the reclaimed land was for agriculture, increasing urbanization has changed the land use of areas protected by the districts. Today fewer wetlands are being reclaimed, leaving districts primarily responsible for maintaining the existing systems used to keep the land within their jurisdiction dry. Since reclamation districts were formed with the purpose of reclaiming specific areas of land (hence their name), they are often defined by the extent of land they protect. Different sides of a river often will fall under the jurisdiction of different reclamation districts.

Federal, state, and local governments all interact with reclamation districts. In states like California, the districts can operate under their own authority. The California Reclamation Districts occupy mostly the Central Valley area that drains into the San Francisco Bay. However, if the Central Valley Flood Protection Board, which is responsible for monitoring California reclamation districts, determines that a local district is not adequately maintaining its levee system, the Board has the power to authorize the California Department of Water Resources to establish a maintenance area and essentially take responsibility of the levee.

Typically, reclamation districts are run by elected board members who often own property or work on land in the districts. The costs of maintaining the levees are paid for by taxes that are placed on property owners. In times of emergency, reclamation districts will appeal to county, state, and federal agencies for additional funds necessary to repair levees.
