= Bradford Island =

Island in California

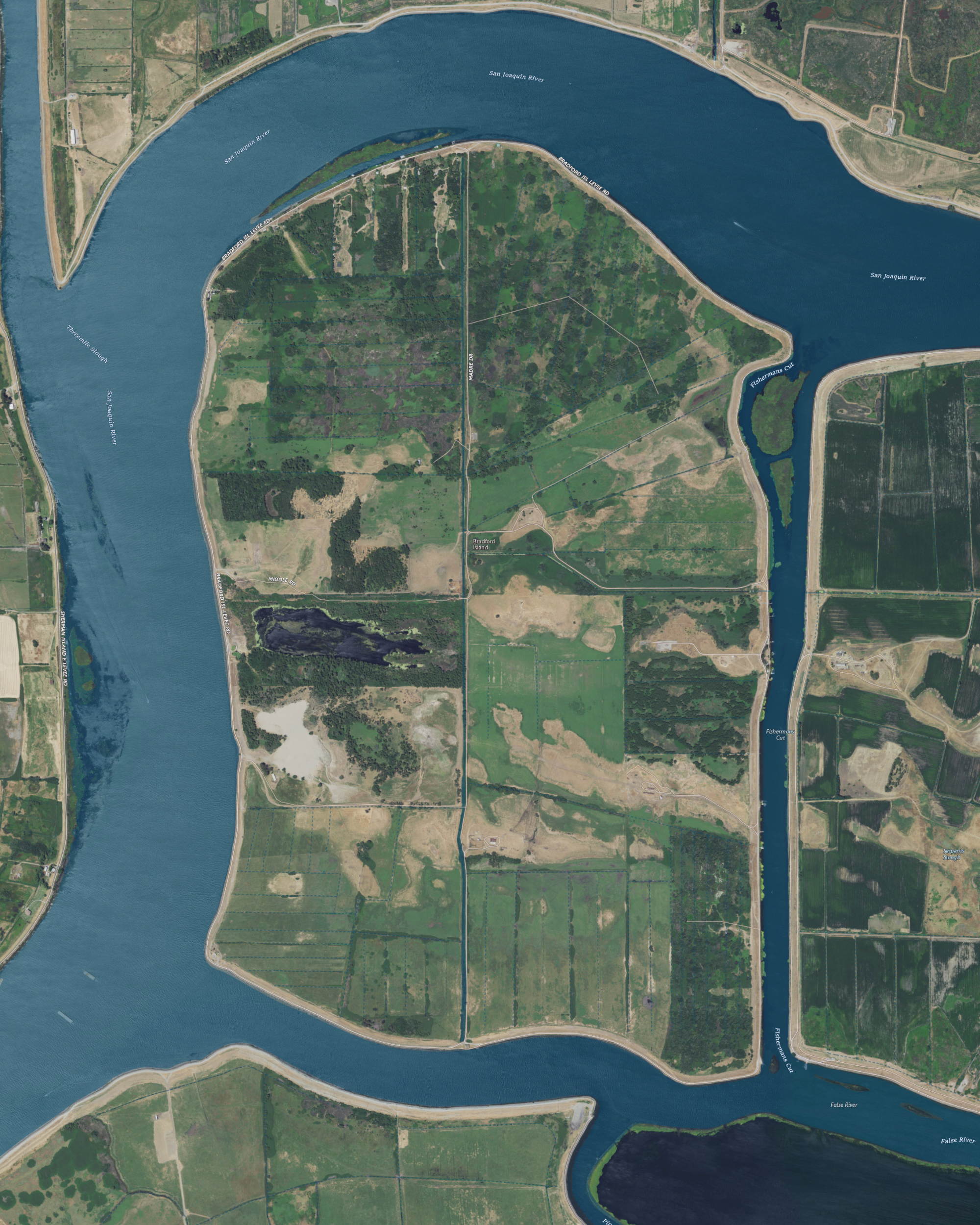
- United States Geological Survey aerial imagery of Bradford Island

- Location within Sacramento-San Joaquin River Delta Location within San Francisco Bay Area Location within California Location within the United States

Geography
- Location: Northern California
- Coordinates: 38°04′38″N 121°39′48″W
- Adjacent to: Sacramento–San Joaquin River Delta
- Area: 2,172 acres (879 ha)
- Highest elevation: −10 ft (-3 m)

Administration
- United States
- State: California
- County: Contra Costa

Demographics
- Population: approx. 48 (as of 2020)

Bradford Island is a 2,172-acre (879 ha) island of the Sacramento–San Joaquin River Delta, in Contra Costa County, California, United States. Bradford Island is inaccessible by roads, and is served by a ferry across the False River from nearby Jersey Island. Approximately 48 people lived on the island as of 2020. Other uses of land include wheat farming, cattle grazing, and natural gas extraction.

Bradford Island is a reclaimed peat wetland; as it lies below sea level, it is protected by flooding by levees. These, as well as a pump station and internal drainage canals, are administered by Reclamation District 2059, founded in 1921. The levees have been breached on several occasions, leading to the island becoming flooded. Bradford Island is one of eight Delta islands considered critical to the region's water quality by the California Department of Water Resources.

== Geography and ecology ==
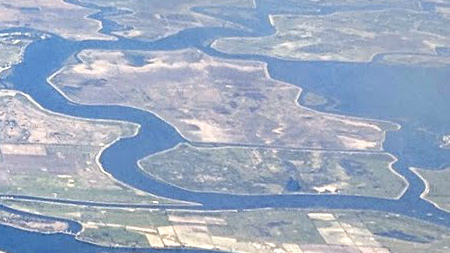
Webb Tract (above) and Bradford Island (below) in an aerial photo taken looking toward the east in 2018.

Bradford Island's coordinates are 38°04′38″N 121°39′48″W, and it is in the lower delta of the San Joaquin River. It falls within the Köppen climate classification of Csb (cool and dry summer Mediterranean). The San Joaquin River separates it from Sherman Island to the west, and Twitchell Island to the north. To its east, it is separated from the Webb Tract by Fisherman's Cut. No bridges go to the island; it is accessible only by a ferry across the False River from Jersey Island to its south. Mount Diablo, to the southwest, can be seen from Bradford Island.

As a reclaimed wetland, Bradford Island has rich peat soil, which is used to grow wheat and graze cattle. Additionally, some land on the island is used for residences. Since Bradford Island is above part of the Rio Vista Gas Field, some land is used for natural gas wells. Due to the history of the island's reclamation, and subsidence in its interior caused by oxidization of the peat, Bradford Island has a saucer-shaped profile — it is lower in the center than at the edges. There is at least one lake on the island.

The islands of the Sacramento–San Joaquin River Delta prevent saltwater intrusion in the Delta; while freshwater flows into the region from the Sacramento and San Joaquin rivers, so does saltwater from the Pacific Ocean through San Francisco Bay. Islands in the Delta reduce the flow of this saltwater, and Bradford Island is one of eight Delta islands considered critical to the region's water quality by the California Department of Water Resources. As it is below sea level, it is protected from flooding by levees and pumps. In 1981, the United States Geological Survey gave its elevation as 0 ft (0 m), but in 2015, the Contra Costa County Local Agency Formation Commission gave its elevation as 5 to 15 feet (1.5 to 4.6 m) below sea level. It is classified by the county as part of the "East County Delta Drainages" watershed.

Ducks, cranes, swans and geese feed in the marshes of Bradford Island; Swainson's hawks, Cooper's hawks and red-tailed hawks have also been seen over the island. In December 2014, Reclamation District 2059's Board of Trustees approved a Project Funding Agreement for the removal and mitigation of Himalayan blackberry and other invasive weeds.

Striped bass were good there in 1962.

== History ==
Approximately ten thousand years ago, sea level rise at the end of the Last Glacial Period moved the Pacific Ocean inwards, creating San Francisco Bay and Suisun Bay in what were once dry valleys. Glacial meltwater flowing from the Sierra Nevada mountains deposited peat and alluvium over compacted lacustrine sediment and aeolian sand fields. The Sacramento–San Joaquin River Delta was built over thousands of years by the confluence of two rivers with drainage basins encompassing nearly half of California, with up to 50 feet (15 m) of organic matter being deposited in some places.

The landmass currently constituting Bradford Island and Webb Tract, as it appears between the San Joaquin and False Rivers in an 1852 survey of the area made by Cadwalader Ringgold, was one of many naturally formed islands in the region. Shaped like "broad shallow saucers", these islands consisted of tule marsh surrounded by naturally-formed levees with woody foliage extending root networks downward into peat. However, spring tides and river floods could submerge the entirety of the Delta.

This large expanse of tidal marshland was discovered by Native American tribes such as the Miwok and Wintun, who used it to fish, hunt and forage; while they did not cultivate it as farmland, they burned vegetation to "manage the landscape [...] to favor plants they used". In 1772, when Spanish explorer Pedro Fages found the Delta, the area was inhabited by large numbers of deer and tule elk, as well as a native population somewhere between 3,000 and 15,000. Attacks from Spanish and Mexican settlers, and a series of epidemics, decreased this population sharply.

European settlement in the area began in the mid-19th century, and accelerated with the California Gold Rush; in 1846 there were about 150 Americans in the entire Central Valley, but after 1848 tens of thousands of people moved to California. Many turned to farming, as "they realized that surer fortunes could be gained by tilling the soil than by turning gravel". The Swamp Land Act of 1850 gave states the ability to purchase federally-owned "swamp and overflowed public lands" on the condition that they be reclaimed and put to productive use; in 1855, California's state legislature passed an act allowing citizens to purchase tracts of swampland for $1 per acre (equivalent to $27.00 in 2025). In 1868, individual acreage limits for purchasers were removed, and counties were authorized to form "reclamation districts" which collected funds to administer levee improvement and maintenance; by 1871, "practically all of California's swamp and overflowed land was sold".

=== Reclamation ===
When reclamation began, the naturally-formed levees surrounding the tule marshes provided an obvious starting point for artificial levees to be constructed. Webb Tract's levees were constructed in 1870, and Bradford Island's in 1871, financed by a land grant.

The reclamation project was carried out by a partnership run by George D. Roberts (for whom Roberts Island is named); his Tide Land Reclamation Company was one of the largest operating in the Delta at the time. Despite being the director of the company, Roberts did not develop Bradford Island in conjunction with it, instead entering in a partnership with other investors. The original levee project enclosed several now-independent tracts (Bradford Island, the Webb Tract, the Franks Tract, Bethel Island and Jersey Island) into one contiguous area, and cost approximately $4 (equivalent to $102.00 in 2025) for each acre of enclosed land. The reclamation process dramatically increased the value of this land, which had been purchased for less than $2 ($51.00 in 2025) per acre, to as much as $50 ($1,273 in 2025) per acre. The portion of the land comprising Bradford Island and Bethel Island (called "Sand Mound Ranch" at the time) were sold to other landowners in 1872. Despite their attempts to build up and further reinforce the levees, floods in 1873 and 1874 "washed onto the pasture-land and small areas of field crops. Additional floods would occur prior to the turn of the century; John Thompson, writing in 1957, said that "probably all of" these tracts were flooded in 1878, and that "several other floodings are understood to have occurred".

Fisherman's Cut, which now separates the islands, was made later; an 1887 topographic and irrigation map made by the California State Engineering Department shows them as a contiguous landmass. However, USGS maps from 1910 (surveyed from 1906 to 1908) show the cut clearly separating Bradford Island from Webb Tract. The currents in Fisherman's Cut were described as "treacherous" in 1942 press reports following a drowning there.

Bradford Island would eventually be cultivated as farmland, but first found use as pasture; after reclamation was completed, it was leased as a stock range for two years by cattle barons Henry Miller and Charles Lux. By 1899 George Shima, a farmer and businessman known as the "Potato King", was reclaiming 400 acres on the island.

=== 20th century ===
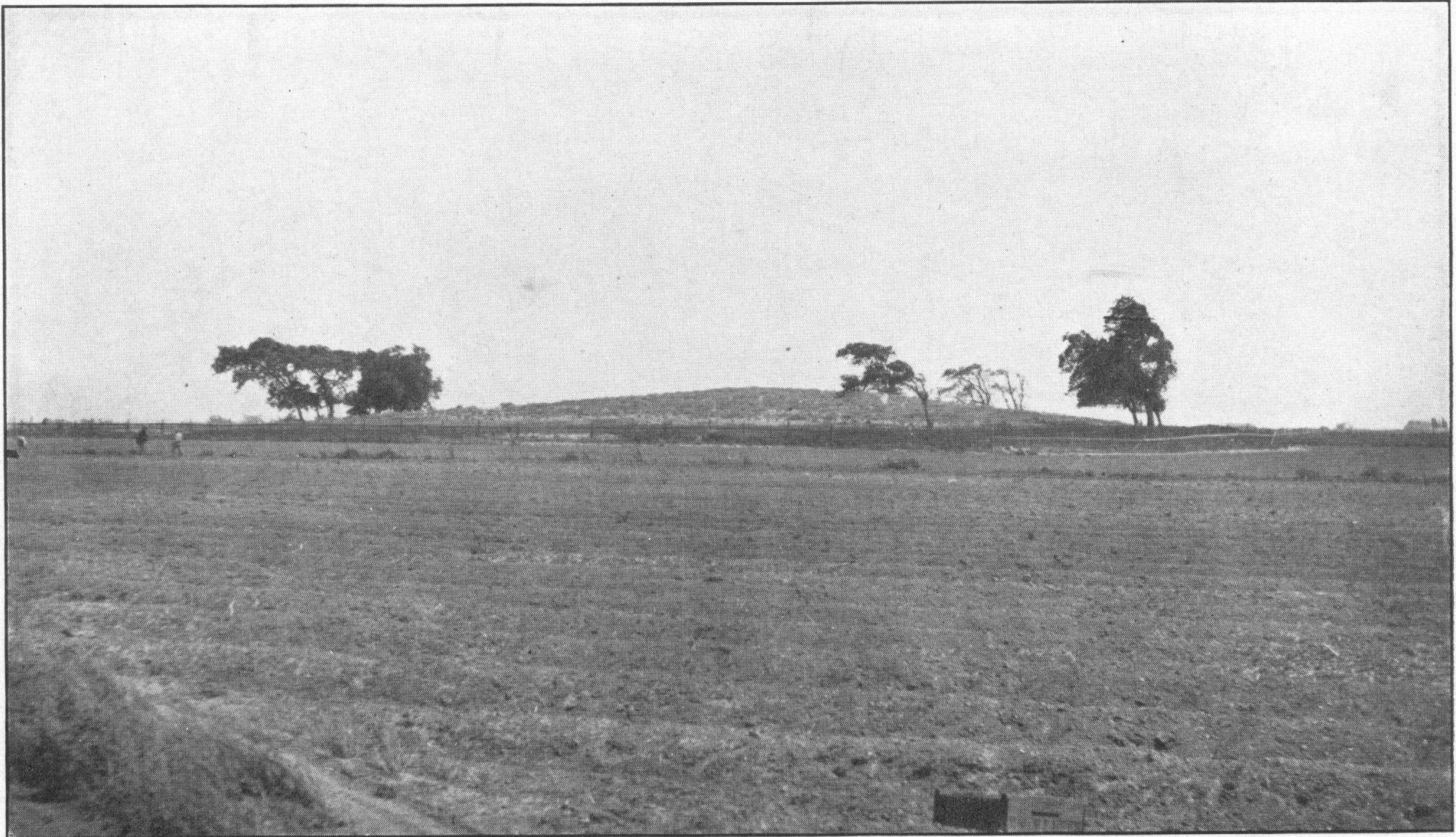
An approximately 20 feet (6.1 m) high shellmound on the western end of Bradford Island in 1909.

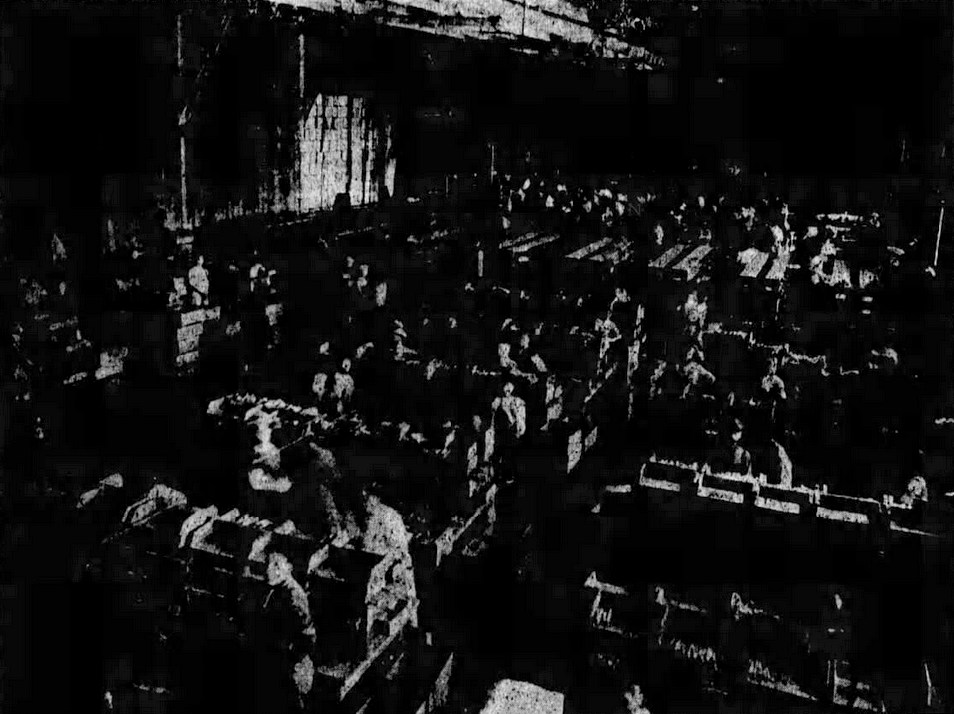
Asparagus packers at the Meek farm, 1915

Potatoes were grown on the island by George Shima in 1900 and 1901. In 1901, some land on Bradford Island was owned by Lester Morse; in 1903, several public officials purchased land on Bradford Island. Superintendent of Public Instruction T.J. Kirk bought 336 acres (136 ha), assistant superintendent and statistician Job Wood bought 102 acres (41 ha), and N.K. Foster, Secretary of the Board of Health, bought 240 acres. 123 acres (50 ha) of Foster's land would be sold in 1922. By 1907, the Meek Brothers (Horry W. and William E., the latter of whom was referred to as the "Asparagus King") owned more than 1,200 acres (490 ha) of land on the island. The capitalist Willis G. Witter owned nearly 500 acres (200 ha) of land on the island when he died in July 1907. 350 acres (140 ha) were sold in 1918 to A. B. Curtis, F. J. Coggina, and J. L. Tence. 300 acres (120 ha) of land on the island was offered to the state prison board for use as a prison farm in 1925, which was never built. 324 acres of land was sold in 1926, by H. J. McCourt to the California Pacific Title Insurance Company, and by 1929 land on Bradford Island was being listed for as much as $250 per acre ($4,688 in 2025). By 1934, much of the island was owned by the California Delta Farms Company. In May 1938, after the discovery of the nearby Rio Vista gas field, the Standard Oil Company of California began exploring Bradford Island for hydrocarbon deposits. Drilling began in 1942 for a gasser, Jordan Unit No. 1; it had multiple producers by 1954. In January 1957, the Contra Costa Gazette reported Standard Oil's announcement that "Jordan Unit Number 1, a wildcat unit, will begin operations in Section 33, 3N-3E". In 1961, there were eight wells, tended by Joe Nichols. Standard Oil, in conjunction with Gulf Oil, filed a lawsuit against Contra Costa County in a 1966 lawsuit, claiming that the county had illegally taxed state and federal governments' royalties from drilling sites in the area. Standard Oil averred that their incomes from the Bradford Island wells had been overtaxed by $6,439.64 ($63,895 in 2025). A 9,567 ft (2,916 m) deep exploratory well previously drilled by Standard was abandoned in 1967. In March 1970, Standard Oil began directionally drill a well under Bradford Island from Sherman Island, 1.5 m (0.0015 km) to the west. This well (Giannini No. 1) was abandoned in April. By 1990, natural gas wells on the island were being operated by the Hess Company.

In 1974, a 335 acres (136 ha) tract of farmland on the island was sold for $185,000, or approximately $552 per acre ($3,604 in 2025).

On November 29, 1903, a murder occurred on Bradford Island; a man named Katsimo was stabbed in the back by his partner, "Big Jack", over a dispute regarding the growing of vegetables. The levees were inundated, and the island was flooded, on March 26, 1907. By April, repairs on the levees were "progressing rapidly" through the use of "immense" pumps. By the time another flood occurred in January 1909, inundating many islands in the area, Bradford Island was one of several reported to be safe. By this point, land on Bradford Island had appreciated considerably; in September of that year, a 103 acres (42 ha) plot was listed for $140 per acre ($4,837 in 2025). The Daily Gazette of Martinez reported in June 1912 that the entirety of Bradford Island was to be sold to Howard S. Dudley, an Oregon businessman, by Pierce & Company, a transaction which was completed in December of that year. Near the end of 1915, the wooden-hulled ship Princess caught fire at Bradford Island. In the 1910s, a floating general store, owned by Frank Bapsette, was operated out of an ark moored to the island. A "large moonshine still", with a capacity of 25 gallons, was confiscated in the Bridgeport Tract of Bradford Island in 1922.

In June 1929, a fire burned large swaths of land on the island, when a high voltage power line operated by Pacific Gas & Electric over the island fell and ignited peat (in addition to damaging a pumping plant). In 1932, the island was flooded again, and in 1934, it would burn again. The fire, described as "the worst that [had] swept the delta district in many years", was caused by embers which had smoldered for several days in peat. It ruined 1,800 acres (730 ha) of barley, as well as two labor camps and a pump house. The fire was spread to the Webb Tract by burning shingles, where farmland and buildings would also be destroyed; a cut in the levees was dredged to assist in quenching the flames. The peat continued to smolder after being extinguished, and peaches laid out to dry in Lodi would be ruined by soot. Several days later, a "cloud of dust and cinders" would be blown from the site of the fire into Stockton, where it added to ash and smoke from other fires that were also occurring in the city.

In March 1939, the state department of public works approved $3,000 ($68,600 in 2025) in emergency repairs for storm damage incurred to the levees. The island would again flood in June 1950, when it (along with the Webb Tract and nearby Franks Tract) were inundated completely. The Army sent two radio-equipped jeeps to maintain communications, and Coast Guard airplane pilots said the situation was "critical". Five families were evacuated; two hundred people were said to be in danger from the flooding. Forty prisoners, from the nearby Marsh Creek prison farm, were forced to haul sandbags all night long, and the levees were reinforced. That night, families who lived on the island "slept in the upper portions of their homes with their belongings stacked on trucks on the levee". The United States Army Corps of Engineers would work to strengthen levees during another flood in December 1950, and Bradford Island was protected from inundation (although nearby Venice Island was sunk). Subsequent work to improve the levees was carried out in 1951 A barge ran aground on Bradford Island in April 1954; while the barge itself was empty, it was filled with gasoline fumes, which exploded. The flaming barge would drift loose, eventually coming to rest on the shores of Twitchell Island. In late 1955, waters began to rise again, and the levees of Bradford Island were seeping by December 24; by December 27, four breaks were reported, which were immediately reinforced by airmen from the Parks and Travis Air Force Bases.

=== Agricultural use ===
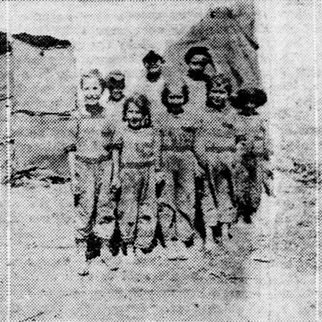
Asparagus field workers from Bradford Island in 1921

Many crops have been grown on the island; in the early 1900s, these included potatoes, and celery. In the 1910s, the harvest on Bradford Island came to include onions, alfalfa, and barley. In 1923, 2,000 acres (810 ha) of the island's 2,160 acres (870 ha) were irrigated for agriculture—with 200 acres (81 ha) devoted to corn, 1,000 acres (400 ha) to grain, and 800 acres (320 ha) to asparagus. Corn would be planted occasionally throughout the early 20th century (also appearing in 1938, 1945, and 1952).

Asparagus farming occurred on the island as early as 1906, in which year fifteen horses were sent to the island to till asparagus fields. In 1907, the Sacramento Bee described Bradford Island as "one of the richest asparagus districts on the Sacramento", and reported that the entirety of the island was planted with asparagus, the yearly packing and shipping of which typically involved around 150 people. This was still going strong by 1915; by 1917, labor shortages caused the Meek farm to begin recruiting high school boys from nearby cities to help cut asparagus. Some of the students came from Oakland; 126 came from Berlekey.

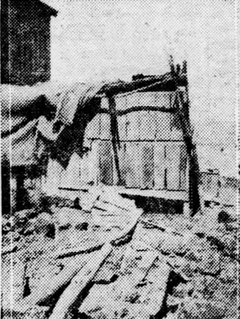
A hut in which a family of four lived

By 1920, living conditions among teenage asparagus workers on the island were found to be "alarming" by state and county officials, and arrangements were sought for some thirty of them to be sent to schools in the area. However, in 1921, the Sacramento Star said that a trip to the island "seemed to take us out of one world into another [...] where child labor laws had been forgotten", with young boys picking asparagus in 115 °F (46 °C) weather with no trees for shade. By November of that year, arrangements were being made for a motorboat to take fifteen of them to schools on nearby Jersey Island. In 1926, the "asparagus schools" were described as a success, and "becoming so well established that some pupils have returned to them every year until they are graduated".

In 1923, 800 acres (320 ha) of asparagus was grown on Bradford Island. Asparagus farming on Bradford Island reached a peak around 1931; by 1934, however, as much as 1,800 acres (730 ha) the island were planted with barley, and asparagus farming had stopped completely by 1952.

For several years, students were transported to the Jersey Island school by boat. In June 1923, however, the establishment of a school on Bradford Island was being considered by the county school board. The school was to be staffed for the next term by a single "emergency teacher": Josephine Ghiggioli, a recent graduate of St. Gertrude's Academy in Rio Vista. Eighteen students on the island were of appropriate age. A meeting was held to discuss the plans on July 14, and it opened on September 11, with a class of either eleven or twelve students. The incorporation of the "emergency school" into a local school district was petitioned in January 1924; the petition was accepted, and a new school district was formed on February 4 (which included Bradford Island in addition to Sand Mound and Jersey Island). By 1930, however, just five children were enrolled in the school—the minimum number necessary for the school's operation to remain funded. In 1938, the school district was suspended, and in 1940, the Board of Supervisors would declare it lapsed, adding it to the Jersey Island school district.

In April 1924, a call was made to the State Housing Commission to investigate living conditions in the workers' camp operated by the L. Scatena company, which by June had been investigated and found "disgraceful". In August, one of the camps on Bradford Island was closed by Dr. C. R. Blake, county health officer. The same camp (Camp No. 5) would again be shut down in 1949.

In 1931 and 1952, large amounts of the island were used for pasture. The land is capable of supporting other crops, like cannabis; in 2012, thirty cannabis plants were found growing on private property on the north side of the island. As marijuana was illegal in California at the time (it would not be legalized until 2016), a man from Bethel Island was arrested on suspicion of growing the plants.

=== Late 20th century onwards ===
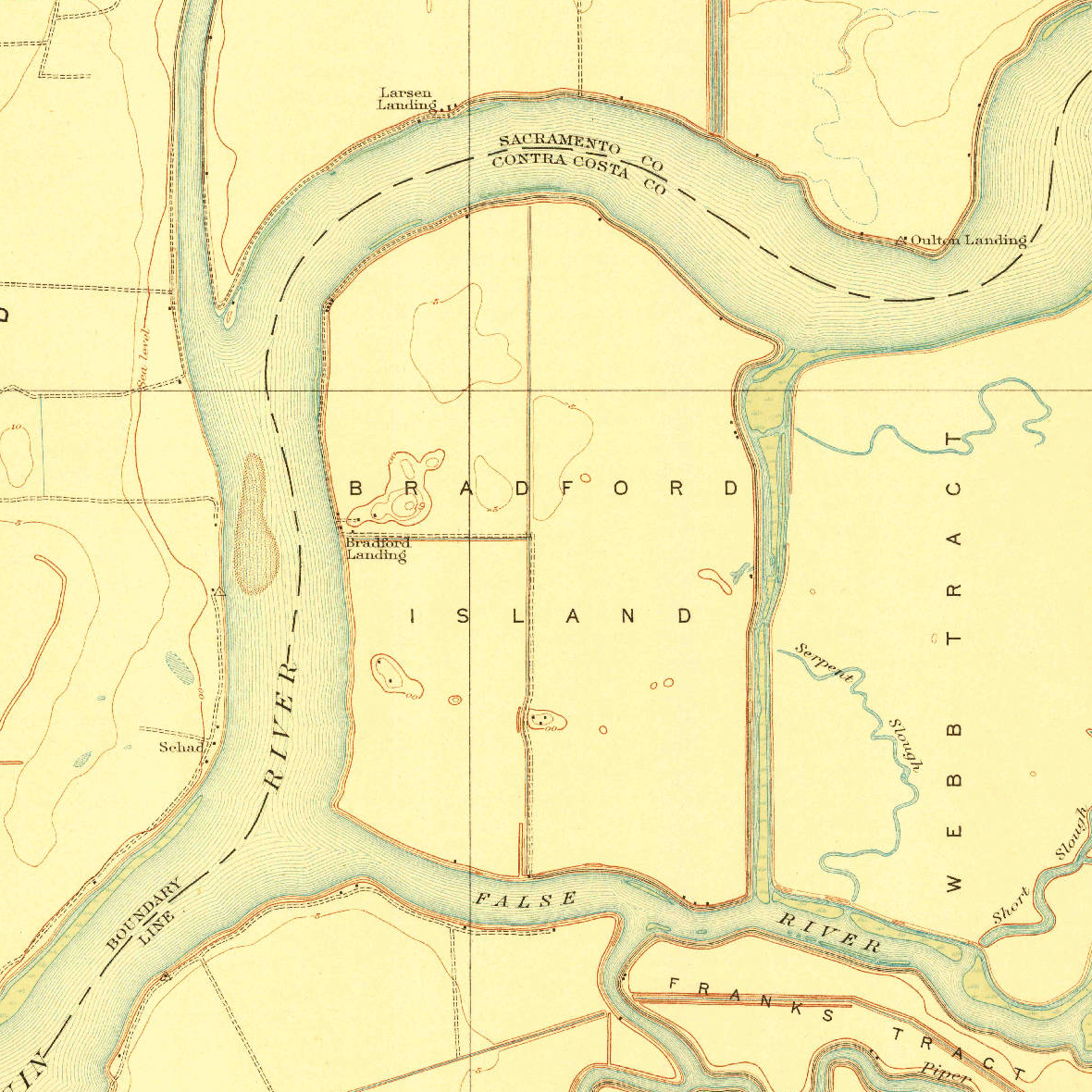
1910 USGS map. Little Franks Tract (now submerged) can be seen to its southeast.

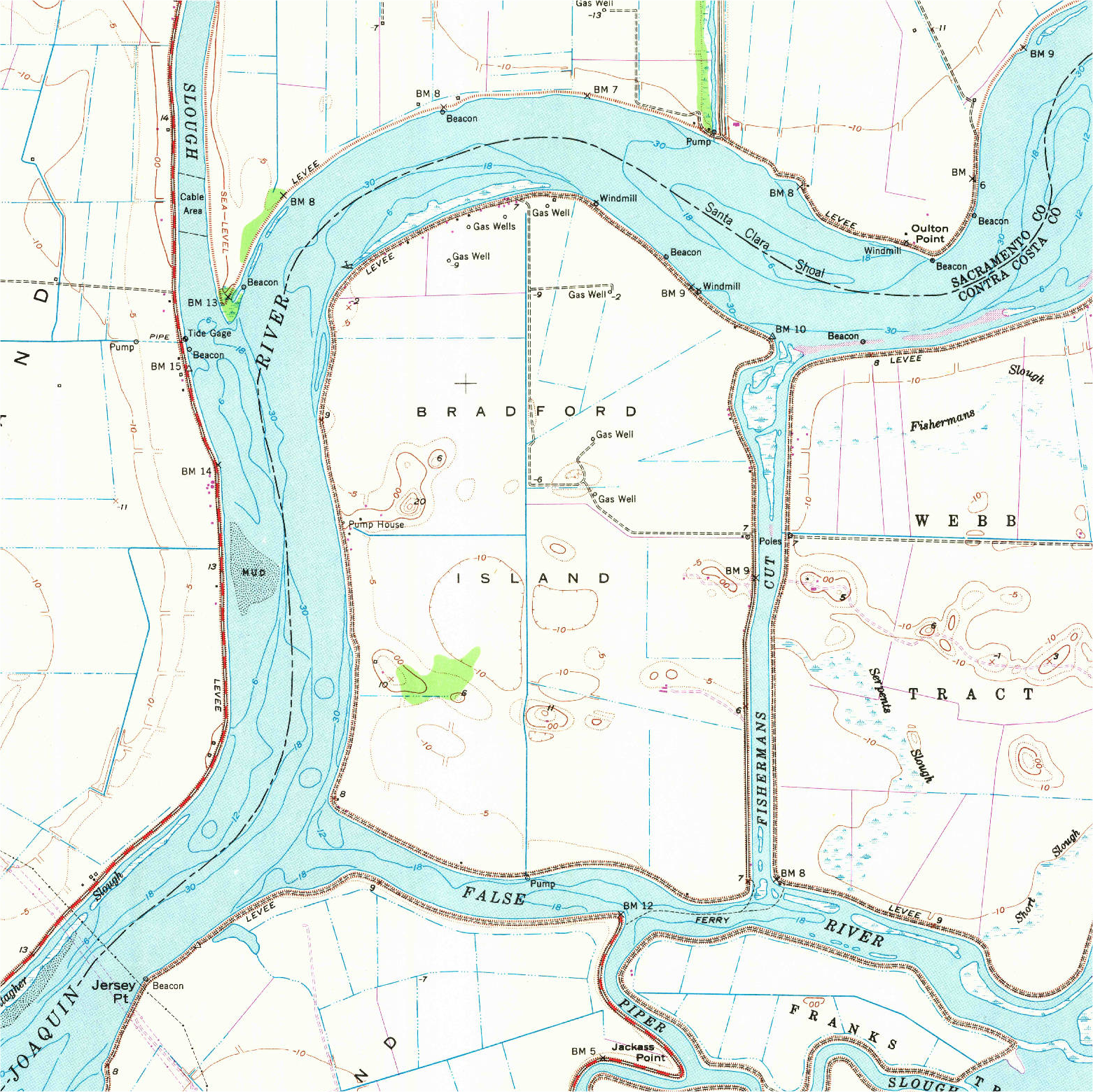
1969 USGS map, with then-current elevations marked. Natural gas wells can now be seen on the north half of the island.

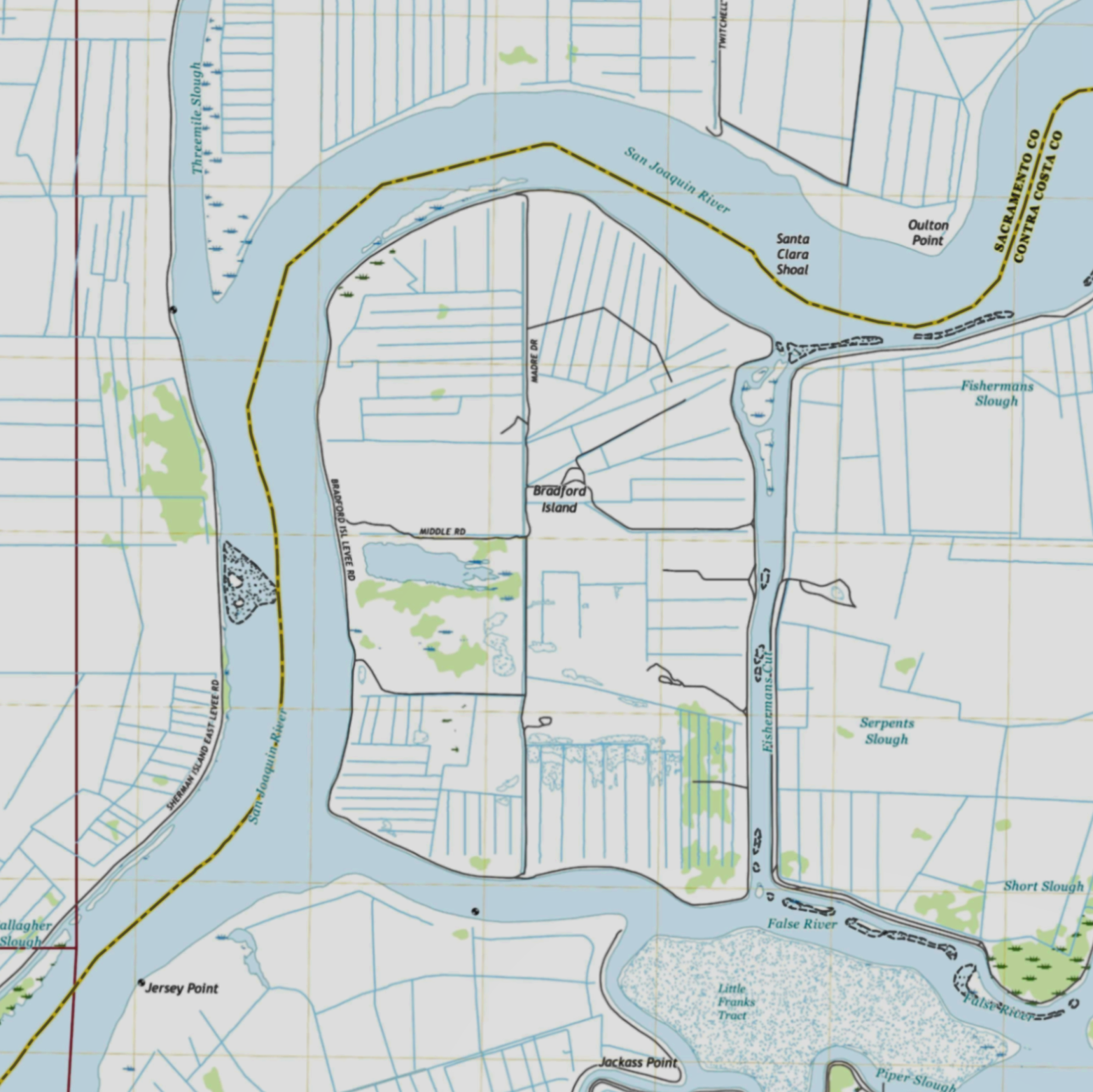
2018 USGS map. Little Franks Tract, as well as small areas of Bradford Island, are now underwater.

In December 1955, heavy rain in the Sierra Nevada caused flooding throughout the Central Valley and Delta (in Rio Vista, water rose to 10 ft (3.0 m) above sea level) and many Delta islands had their levees overrun by water. Bradford Island was among several with "soggy levees and disappearing freeboards"; on December 26, it flooded.

Bradford Island was not served by electrical utilities until 1958, and in 1961 there were still no telephones; the only means of communication with the mainland were the ferry and resident Joe Nichols' radio set. In 1969, telephone lines were finally run to the island.

In November 1960, a cottage on the island burned to the ground, resulting in the deaths of two infants; county sheriff's deputies were unable to get firefighting equipment on the island in time. Their 17-year-old uncle was also killed attempting to rescue them; clothes and money were gathered for a memorial fund to replace the home and personal possessions of the family.

In 1970, residents presented county supervisors with plans regarding potential improvement and development of land on the island. The suggestions mostly constituted elimination of minimum parcel sizes, expansion of the reclamation board, and requests for county assistance with community services. Additionally, a 244 acres (99 ha) tract of land on the north side of the island was under consideration to be preserved as agricultural land under the 1965 Preserve Act.

In 1992, a fire burned more than half of the island, and residents were evacuated. The fire, which began on November 28, was contained within two days.

In 1986, the decommissioned minesweeper USS Lucid was purchased by William Gardner, a scrap metal dealer, and brought to his residence on Bradford Island. Lucid, an oceangoing wooden ship that had seen use in the Vietnam War, was used as a floating warehouse. Gardner removed or sold everything of value from the ship, and used it as a storage building, cutting a hole in the hull on the port side near the waterline to use as a door. He was murdered over a property dispute in 2004. In 2005, his widow donated the ship to United States Navy veteran Mike Warren, whose "Save an MSO Foundation" began restoration by removing the large amount of scrap metal that had been stored in it and patching the hole. In 2011, the ship was moved to the Stockton Maritime Museum to be restored for use as a museum ship.

Other structures formerly moored to Bradford Island include a century-old 1,000 sq ft (93 m^{2}) farmhouse on a barge, which was kept tied to a pier by a farmer who lived in it while working his land on the island. In 2010, the Contra Costa Sheriff's marine patrol said that it was illegally moored, and demanded it be removed.

In 2010, a fire charred hundreds of acres of land and ignited peat vegetation. Bradford Island, at the time, had not been annexed to any Contra Costa County fire district; while firefighters from the East Contra County Fire District attended the fire (and performed a voluntary evacuation which took 15 people off the island), they did not help to fight it, saying the district "only responds to fires outside its jurisdiction when lives are in jeopardy". Residents did so themselves, using hoses, tractors, and "a single water truck". The fire caused an estimated $675,000 (equivalent to $996,586 in 2025) in property damage and burned approximately 550 acres (220 ha) of land, as well as homes, docks, and a pumping station. Another fire, in October 2015, was similarly not responded to by firefighting agencies; the Contra Costa County Sheriff's Department, however, used a helicopter to dump water on the fire in an attempt to contain it. By the time the fire was extinguished, fourteen utility poles had burned.

In 1950, approximately 30 people lived on the island, in addition to over 1,000 head of cattle; in 1961 the Oakland Tribune reported that seven families lived there, and the Contra Costa Times mentioned eight families by 1969. However, after flooding in the early 1980s, most residents left the island: while "about 25 or 30" people lived there prior to the December 1983 flood, only one family and "three or four other people" remained in January 1984.

According to the United States Census, the population of Bradford Island in 2000 was 48. In 2009, the Contra Costa Times said that "roughly 100 people [called] the island home", and an article in the Silicon Valley Mercury News similarly quoted a spokesman for the Contra Costa County Sheriff as saying that "roughly 100" people lived on Bradford Island. However, the Contra Costa County Local Agency Formation Commission cites a 2009 population figure of "approximately 63" residents, and in 2010, FireFighting News said that "not much [had] changed since" the population of 48 recorded in the 2000 census. In 2010, a resident of the island said that "about 15" people lived there year-round. In 2013, the number of residents was given by Mercury News as 13, and in 2017 the island had 8 full-time residents. A 2020 newsletter from the Reclamation District gave its population as "approximately 48".

== Governance ==
Bradford Island is an unincorporated area near the northeast corner of Contra Costa County, in Supervisorial District III and census tract 3010. It is not part of any public healthcare service district, mosquito abatement district, municipal water district, or wastewater district. is located in the Byron Brentwood Knightsen Union Cemetery District. It consists of 64 parcels, all of which are zoned for agricultural use; the majority are zoned A-2, and two large parcels on the north side of the island are zoned A-4. Its law enforcement jurisdiction is designated PSA-6 (county-wide police protection pervices); a municipal service review of law enforcement noted that Bradford Island and the Webb Tract were the only areas of the county identified as "difficult to serve", since they are only accessible via the ferry from Jersey Island.

As late as 1960, there existed no firefighting services on the island and home insurance was prohibitively expensive as a result. While it is not part of any fire protection district, it was noted in a 2009 municipal service review that the East Contra Costa Fire Protection District had been "historically providing fire service to Jersey Island, Bradford Island and Webb Tract". Bradford Island was one of the only parts of the county meeting suburban/rural standard for dispatch times, which "[called] into question the practical relevance of the State guidelines".

=== Reclamation District ===
Reclamation District 2059 (whose boundaries are coterminous with Bradford Island) was formed on 21 November 1921, to provide maintenance for levees and internal drainage systems. In the original 1921 initial formation papers of Reclamation District 2059, the boundaries of the District (and of Bradford Island, then referred to as "Bradford Tract") were described as:

Commencing at the junction of the East Bank of San Joaquin River with the North bank of False River, thence East along said North Bank of False River to the junction thereof with the West Bank of a North and South Dredger-Cut, thence north along said West bank of said Dredger-Cut to the junction thereof with the West Bank of Fisherman's Slough; thence along the West Bank of said Fisherman's Slough in a general northerly direction to the junction thereof with the South Bank of San Joaquin River, thence Westerly and thence Southerly along the south and east bank of said San Joaquin River to the point of commencement.

In 1969, county supervisors appointed three valuation assessment commissioners for the District, who were directed to prepare an "operation and maintenance assessment roll for the district".

The District is responsible for maintaining 7.4 miles (11.9 km) of levees around the island, one pump station, and over seven miles (11 km) of internal drainage canals. It derives revenue primarily from state and federal levee subvention grants, ferry service fees, and property assessments, which landowners pay yearly in proportion to the amount of land they own.

The District operates under an amended set of bylaws, adopted in May 2018, and is managed by a board of five Trustees elected from the island's landowners by a majority vote at the District's general election. Trustees serve staggered four-year terms, and regular meetings are held monthly. Prior to this, amended bylaws had been adopted by the Board and voted on by landowners in 2014 and 2006. By August 2019, the Board served a population of 15 (according to the Contra Costa County Department of Conservation & Development) and consisted of "five landowners or legal representatives of landowners elected at large for four-year terms".

In 2008, the Board of Trustees determined that the Reclamation District lacked funds necessary for several maintenance tasks (including the ferry and a pump station replacement); in 2010, a majority vote approved a proposition to change assessment procedures. Whereas assessments had previously been made on an ad valorem basis, the proposition changed them to a "special benefit" basis, in which parcels' assessments were based on the amount of special benefit derived (according to the land use code). This proposition had a 5-year sunset clause, scheduled to expire in May 2015.

The reclamation district has been the subject of controversy, including a protracted dispute over its management and bylaws which received extended media coverage. In the mid-2000s, 42% of the island's acreage was owned by Paul Sosnowski, who came up with various ideas for real estate developments on his land. One was a casino; a convalescent home, golf course, fire station, "Western saloon", and winery were also put forward. Some landowners resisted Sosnowski's plans, describing them as "pipe dreams" due to the island's inaccessibility and the difficulty of securing federal, state and county permits for development on an island well below sea level. Former district trustee Michael Hamman said that "everyone wanted a rural, quiet setting and nothing changed until Paul came along [...] who's going to take a ferry to play golf for Christ's sake?"

The reclamation district's board requires a majority of trustees to approve plans for the management of the island. In the district's trustee elections, votes are apportioned to trustees by the acreage of their properties (each dollar of assessment equals one vote); Sosnowski was elected to the reclamation district's board of trustees in 2006; afterwards, the board hired his personal attorney as its staff lawyer. He then amended its bylaws to "broaden its powers beyond levee maintenance".

In 2006, Paul Sosnowski petitioned the district to expand its board from three to five members. Subsequently, his girlfriend became a member of the board. They gifted one percent of a single parcel to a maintenance worker at Sosnowski's marina, Steve Lucas, who then became a landowner eligible for board membership; Sosnowski's ownership of large amounts of the island permitted him to cast thousands of votes (one per acre owned) and elect Lucas to the board. Sosnowski intended to use his absolute majority to develop various businesses on the island. It was later discovered that part of Sosnowski's land had been underwater, leaving him 3.6 acres (1.5 ha) short of majority ownership; he was removed from the board as a result.

Yearly revenues for Reclamation District 2059
Year	Assess- ments (general)	Assess- ments (special)	Rents, leases, concessions & royalties	Licenses, permits & franchises	Penalties & costs of delinquent taxes & assessments	Prior-year taxes & assess- ments	Total
2003							$1,190,136
2004							$1,280,000
2005							$456,495
2006							$1,490,000
2007							$2,340,000
2008							$245,826
2009							$312,914
2010							$659,214
2011							$942,249
2012							$441,925
2013							$2,230,000
2014							$575,727
2015							$6,240,000
2016							$1,110,000
2017	$390,664		$8,665	$5,610	$28,560	$29,721	$464,246
2018	$230,357	$152,045	$5,500	$560	$7,323	$8,038	$621,392
2019	$232,406	$158,258	$10,531	$5,100	$4,030	$2,768	$413,093
Average	$284,476	$103,434	$8,232	$3,757	$13,304	$13,509	$1,236,072

== Ferry ==
The island has been accessible by boat for almost all of its history—a steamer landing was advertised as an amenity for tracts on the island as early as 1907. Chris Lauritzen, the operator of the first regular ferry service, began making runs between Bradford Island and Jersey Island in 1922. However, as the island became more densely inhabited, residents began to petition for improved access. A proposal was made in 1946 to construct a bridge from Bethel Island to the Webb Tract, via the northeastern part of Franks Tract (which had not yet been submerged); this would have allowed much easier access to Bradford Island. However, the plan did not come to fruition. In 1948, a flat-bottom dowager, the Victory II, was constructed for the specific purpose of serving as a ferry between the four islands (Jersey Island, Bradford Island, Webb Tract and Franks Tract. 64 ft (20 m) long and 27 ft (8.2 m) wide, with a displacement of 100 short tons (91 t) when loaded, the ferry was built with two separate propellers at opposite ends (rather than a forward and reverse gear). It was operated by C. A. Lauritzen and his father. In 1949, residents asked the county's Board of Supervisors to improve ferry service, saying that "the area was isolated from 5pm until 8am each day" and that they "might as well be in jail". The request was taken under advisement, and a surveyor sent to make reconnaissance surveys. By 1951, ferry slips were under construction at Jersey Island, Bradford Island, and Franks Tract; upon their completion, the Victory II would begin making "hourly runs".

In January 1959, a proposal for the county to purchase and operate the ferry service was rejected; its annual operating costs at the time were $30,000 (equivalent to $334,775 in 2025). In October, the Contra Costa County Board of Supervisors announced that bids would open on November 10 for a five-year contract to provide ferry service between the four islands. Other options (such as forming a tax district to buy the ferry) had proven unsuccessful or undesirable. The requirements for the contract included a 50 short tons (45 t) capacity (or twelve automobiles), and a guarantee of twelve trips per day from Monday through Saturday (as well as six on Sunday). The Victory II was scheduled to make her final voyage on October 31, and afterwards be sold for an asking price of $65,000 (equivalent to $717,894 in 2025). Due to the inaccessibility of the islands without any ferry services, Lauritzen agreed to operate a "smaller boat for passengers only" until public bidding for the contract opened in November. On November 19, a contract was signed with M.W. Bartee to provide emergency ferry service for the next 30 days, with the option available for two 30-day extensions. December 1, however, was set as a deadline for residents to decide between a tax increase or future suspension of the ferry service. Residents, however, said that their tax burden was unfairly high (for example, over $34,000 in taxes was paid to county school districts annually while only one child there was of school age). At the hearing on that day, an agreement was made to create a taxing district, bids were opened for a ten-year ferry contract, and Bartee was released from his obligations on the emergency contract (for which ferry service had not actually been started yet). Instead, temporary services would be provided by John Vitale; a hearing for the formation of the taxing district was scheduled for December 22, and bids for the 10-year contract were to open on January 5. Several days later, a temporary ferry service contract was signed with Lauritzen until May 10. The lowest bid received, on January 6, was $63,000 (equivalent to $685,630 in 2025), to be carried out by Jack F. Freitas.

In 1969, Freitas was still operating the ferry; in September of that year, it was restricted to "only foot traffic" for two weeks, due to Coast Guard inspections. In 1972, $60,000 was approved for repair of ferry slips; 25% of the cost was paid by county service area M-1, and the remainder was paid by a special tax levy. In that same year, Daniel Pringle (who had operated the ferry for some time) died. By 1974, Freitas was the "last passenger ferry captain of Contra Costa County"; by 1975, the ferry was being operated by Louis Immethun.

In 1975, legal disputes regarding the ferry began again. On September 21, the county's board of supervisors authorized legal action against Immethun by the reclamation districts of both Bradford Island and the Webb Tract, due to suspension of the day's last ferry run. The reclamation districts alleged that the contract for ferry service, which was defined as ending at 5:00 PM, included a final run at 5:00 PM (as had been the case prior to Immethun taking over the service). Landowners on the island said that they had suffered economic losses, and that schoolchildren on the island were unable to participate in after-school activities, due to the reduction in service. The Contra Costa County Superior Court subsequently issued a court order requiring Immethun to resume making the 5 PM runs until October 26, at which date a hearing was scheduled. In May 1977, the case was settled, and the Superior Court ruled that the vessel was required to make a "straggler run" at the end of each day.

In 1978, the cost of operating the ferry began to "stir up a storm" for the county budget, as tax revenues had decreased significantly despite the contract being set to expire in 1988. In June, county officials were reported saying that they would "try to work out an agreement with the operator to charge tolls". By August, the county's Board of Supervisors entered an agreement to pay the ferry line with property taxes collected from the islands, as well as county gasoline taxes. Ferry service was eventually suspended in June 1980; while the Board of Supervisors met in July and committed $33,000 (equivalent to $128,948 in 2025) to restore services, the county was sued by a fish farm operator in October for the service interruption. By December, litigation was dropped, as a tentative agreement had been reached for the county to purchase the ferry service from Immethun outright for approximately $170,000 ($664,277 in 2025). The plan was approved in April 1981, for a final cost of $227,000 ($803,889 in 2025). Ferry service, which had run for fifty continuous years prior to the 1980 interruption, resumed in November of that year. In 1987, however, the county's subsidy was halted due to a dispute with a landowner; the next year, it was determined that the ferry would shut down permanently in January 1989, with no alternative proposed. The ferry captain, Bob Landrun, said "it's like they took away the road in front of your home". A "temporary bailout" was approved in February; the shutdown was postponed until May. By March 1990, however, the Victory II remained in regular operation; funds were provided when the county "just about doubled the taxes on the land". In May 1994, the ferry became inoperable when its engines (which were 47 years old) broke; service was restored in July, after a tense period in which "tempers flared, patience grew thin and petty disputes escalated into big arguments".

In 1999, stripers to six pounds were caught at Bradford Island.

In 1975, a 523 ft (159 m) freighter (the Rice Queen) ran aground near Bradford Island.

In 1959, a number of houses in Oakland, "whose only fault [was] that they lay in the path of a new freeway", were moved on barges to new locations in the Bay Area; one was sent to Bradford Island.

16 gas wells and three natural gas lines owned by PG&E, as of 2008.

$21.6 million in assets, according to the Sacramento Bee in 2008.

"Among those unlikely to be saved" in 2008. "Our argument is that at some point in the future, you abandon that island".

Catfish were "red hot" in 1960.

In December 1964, waters rose in the region, causing a "400-foot landslide" to occur at Bradford Island. However, crews "held their own" and the island was protected from total inundation.

Ferry service to the island, contained within County Service Area M-1, is administered by the Delta Ferry Authority, of which the District is a part. —the ferry's service area was only formed in 1960. In 1987, a joint-power agreement was formed between Bradford Island's reclamation district (RD 2059) and Webb Tract's reclamation district (RD 2026) to split the cost of the ferry's operation. Its total operating cost is approximately $9,000 per month. The ferry, Victory II, costs $7.50 for a round trip, but landowners of record (people listed on the title of a piece of property) can obtain passes allowing them, as well as their domestic partners and family members, to take the ferry for free. The District has several part-time employees (a District Manager and Levee Superintendent), and several contract employees who carry out support services (a District Engineer and District Legal Counsel). The ferry occasionally closes for Coast Guard inspections.

== Levees ==
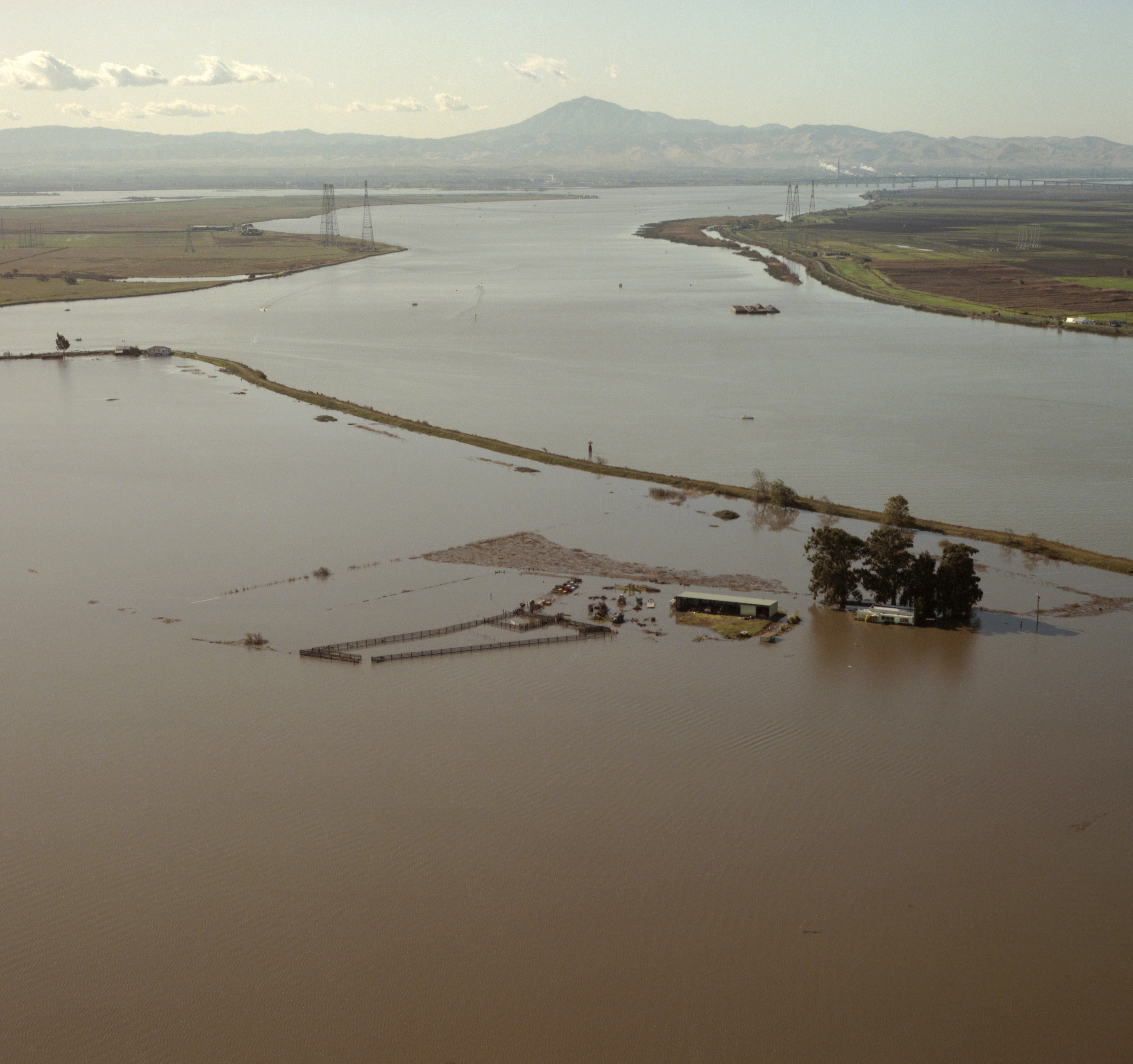
Aerial photograph of the southwest corner of Bradford Island, almost completely flooded in December 1983; the levee remains visible above the water

Bradford Island's levees, initially constructed in 1871, have been monitored since their construction: in 1914, when storms threatened to flood islands of the Delta, farm owners hired watchmen to immediately report levee breaks, and dredgers were being "held in readiness to be towed to the first point of alarm by powerful tugs", and farm owners "moved all of the machinery and farm implements on [the island] to the levees where they [would] be protected as much as possible". In January 1973, the levees were protected from flooding again, as county officials sandbagged them during a period of heavy rainfall.

In January 1980, during the "Battle of the Delta", three floating cranes were sent to Bradford Island to shore up levees during heavy flooding from "ocean-sized waves" (which had at that point already inundated the Webb Tract). By January 26, ninety state workers had been sent to stack sandbags.

On December 2, 1983, governor George Deukmejian declared a state of emergency. In January 1984, the island was still flooded, with restoration expected to take months. The levees are now administered by Reclamation District 2059. The Contra Costa Local Agency Formation Commission estimated the annual cost of this maintenance at $2,500 per mile ($1,553 per kilometer) based on expenditures from fiscal year 2012–2013. From 1924 to 1956, they were tended by Joe Nichols, an island resident who also assisted in the construction of the schoolhouse. The levees have experienced a number of breaches and failures, and the island has been flooded as a result on numerous occasions. On 3 December 1983, a storm caused a 600-foot (180 m) breach in the levees, flooding the island completely. Residents were evacuated by ferry, and most did not return. While the Governor of California's request for national disaster status was rejected by the federal government in January, the Small Business Administration declared the island a disaster loan area in February, authorizing federal assistance to displaced families. Cleanup costs were expected to be approximately $6 million (equivalent to $19.4 million in 2025). In February 1998, U.S. Army Corps of Engineers personnel worked to restore levee damage done by storms in the area. On 27 August 2009, additional levee damage occurred when a freighter, the 570-foot (170 m) Tasman Resolution, ran aground on the north side of the island. The accident occurred at 8:30 pm in calm, clear weather, causing 12 feet (3.7 m) of damage to the rock base and washing out a 150-foot (46 m) section of the levee. The damage required $800,000 (equivalent to $1.2 million in 2025) in repairs, performed by the Coast Guard). While 100 people were planned to be evacuated from the island the day after, deputies found only nine, of whom eight refused to leave – the single evacuee was taken by boat to nearby Bethel Island for the night.

In 2014, substantial improvements were made to the levee system, which included supplementing them with rip-rap, reinforcing back slopes, and raising the levee crowns. As of these improvements, seven miles of levees met or exceeded Hazard Mitigation Plan (HMP) standards, with 0.5 miles (0.80 km) along the northern boundary with the San Joaquin River needing rehabilitation. In July 2014, an emergency drought barrier was placed across the False River, and in August 2014, a levee improvement upgrade to meet the Federal Emergency Management Agency's 100-year flood protection standard was "fast approaching [its] conclusion". In 2015, a "Muscle Wall" was placed on the low spots of the island's levees "just in time" for a 4.43 foot (1.35 m) high tide on July 2, and work to remove the drought barrier began in September.

In 2015, during a District levee inspection, goats were found to be "running rampant" on the levee crown, slopes and neighboring properties, potentially contributing to levee erosion. As District policy forbids goats on the levees, landowners were encouraged to contact Bradford Reclamation District with any sightings of, or information in connection to, goats on the levees.

In August 2018, the reclamation district declared the island in a state of emergency due to seepage occurring on a 25-foot-wide (7.6 m) section of levee. Emergency repairs were conducted, in which holes were repaired with steel sheet piles in a "temporary fix" for an estimated cost of $200,000 (equivalent to $256,427 in 2025).
