= Rio Vista Gas Field =

Natural gas field in northern California, US

Coordinates: 38.1400°N 121.6751°W

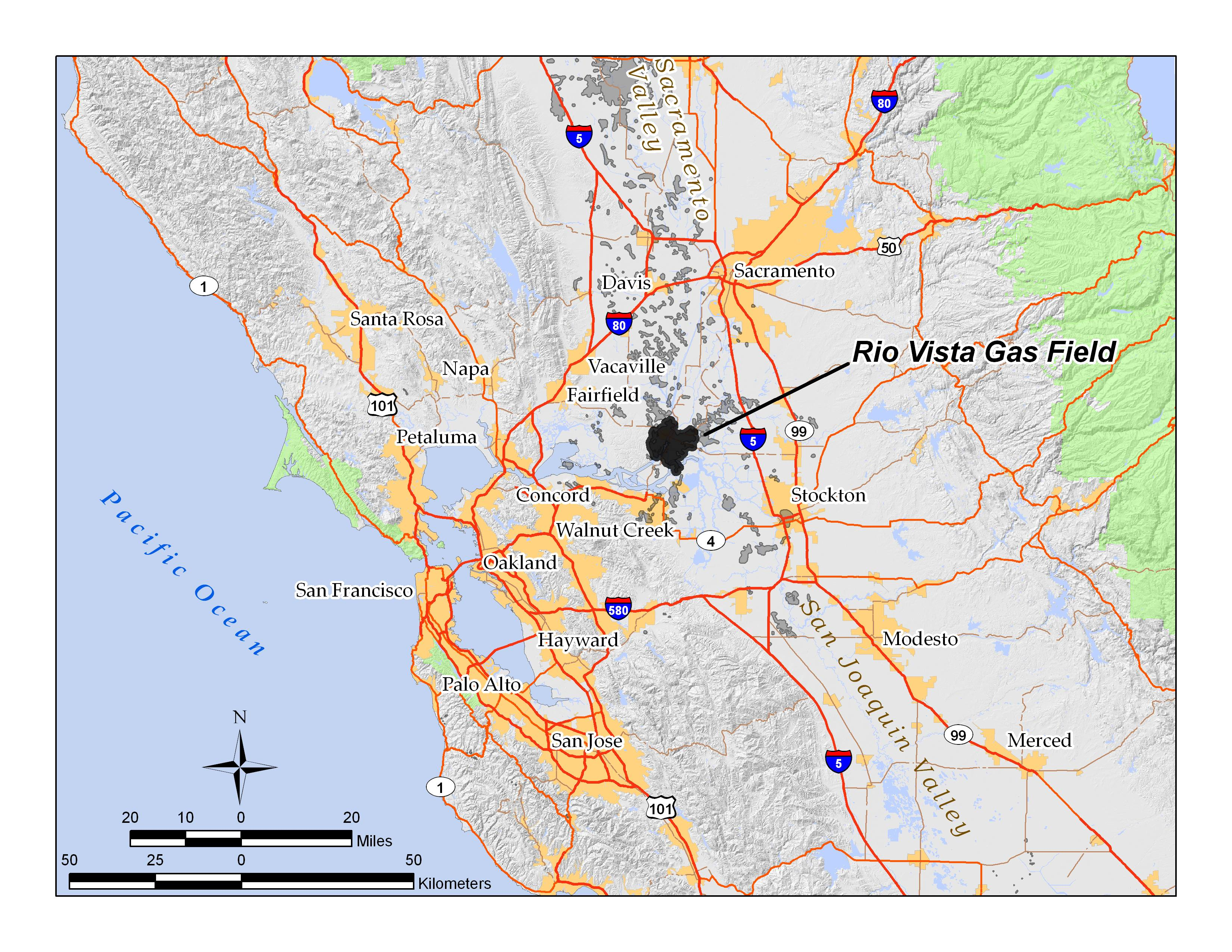
Location of the Rio Vista field in northern California. Other natural gas fields are shown in dark gray.

The Rio Vista Gas Field is a large natural gas field in the Sacramento–San Joaquin River Delta in northern California, adjacent to Rio Vista, California. Discovered in 1936, and in continuous operation since, it has produced over 3.6 trillion cubic feet (100 km^{3}) of gas in its lifetime, and retains an estimated reserve of approximately 330 billion cubic feet (9.3×10^{9} m^{3}). In 2008 alone, the most recent year for which data was available, it produced 18 billion cubic feet (510,000,000 m^{3}) of gas. Spanning portions of three counties and covering over 29,000 acres (120 km^{2}), it is the largest natural gas field in California, and one of the fifteen largest in the United States.

As of 2009, the primary operator on the field was Rosetta Resources of Houston, Texas, which owned 171 of the field's 189 active wells. The remaining 18 were run by several smaller operators, including Towne Exploration, Royale Energy, and Tri-Valley Oil & Gas.

== Geographic setting ==
The gas field underlies portions of Solano, Sacramento, and Contra Costa counties, in the bottomlands of the Sacramento – San Joaquin River Delta as well as some adjacent upland areas in the Montezuma Hills. The town of Rio Vista is entirely surrounded by the gas field, and the Trilogy retirement community, north of Rio Vista, is on the field's northern boundary. Additionally, the city of Isleton is on the gas field near its eastern border with the River Island Gas Field. Several state highways intersect the field, providing primary surface transportation through the area. California State Route 12 crosses the gas field from west to east, bridging the Sacramento and Mokelumne Rivers; and California State Routes 84 and 160 cross the field from north to south, with Route 160 built on levees much of the way.

Much of the field underlies islands in the Delta, some of which are accessible only by ferry. Included in the gas field are Bradford Island, Twitchell Island, Brannan Island, Andrus Island, and parts of Tyler, Sherman, and Decker Island. Most of the land area within these islands – much of which is below sea level – consists of agricultural fields protected by levees constructed in the late 19th and early 20th centuries. Drilling and maintenance pads for the gas wells are interspersed among agricultural fields, recreational areas, vacation homes, and waterways. Elevations on the gas field range from around 180 feet (55 m) in the Montezuma Hills southwest of Rio Vista to around ten feet below sea level in parts of the Delta islands protected by levees. Ground has been slowly subsiding in these areas for decades, due to a combination of peat decomposition, groundwater removal, and compaction of the underlying geologic structures from which trillions of cubic feet of gas have been removed.

Climate in the area is subhumid with hot, dry summers and cool, rainy winters, with all precipitation occurring as rain. Mean annual rainfall is 14 to 16 inches (410 mm). Freezes occur occasionally during the winter, with the freeze-free period encompassing 250 to 275 days. Drainage on the field is poor except in the Montezuma Hills, in which it is to the south and southeast towards the Sacramento River via ephemeral streams which dry up completely in the summer. Native vegetation types include bulrushes and cattails in the wetlands and annual grasslands on the hills.

== Geology ==
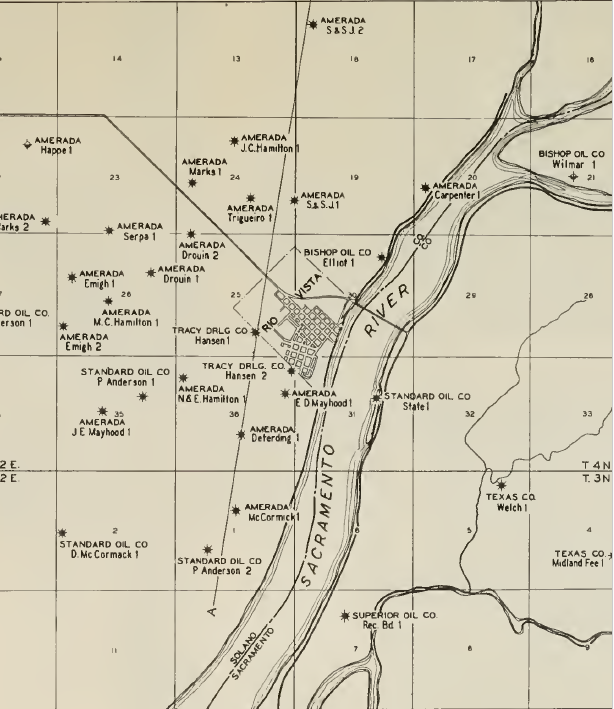
Rio Vista Gas Field Map

The Rio Vista field is within the Sacramento Basin, a large structural trough between the California Coast Ranges and Sierra Nevada, filled with up to 40,000 feet (12,000 m) of sediments deposited over tens of millions of years. Wide variations in porosity and permeability within these sedimentary rock layers, along with abundant structural and stratigraphic traps, have allowed for the formation of numerous natural gas reservoirs in the Basin. These reservoirs have filled with gas by slow accumulation, with gas migrating from distant source rock over millions of years. The Rio Vista, at the southern end of the Sacramento Basin, is the largest of these regional gas fields.

Overall the field is an anticlinal structure somewhat akin to a dome, with its axis running northwest to southeast. One large fault, the Midland Fault, cuts through the middle of the field from north to south, and numerous small faults intersect the field elsewhere. Vertical offset along the Midland Fault of the Domengine Formation, one of the major gas-bearing rock units, is up to 500 feet. The eastern boundary of the field is demarcated by the Isleton Fault.

By November 1980, twelve separate pools, or producing horizons, had been identified in the field, varying in depth from 2,450 feet (the "Sidney" zone) to 9,600 feet (the "Peterson" zone, discovered in 1966). As of 2010, Rosetta Resources claimed to have produced from zones as deep as 11,000 feet.

== History, production, and operations ==
The discovery well for the field was "Emigh No. 1", which came in on June 19, 1936, drilled by Amerada Petroleum Corporation. It flowed 8,750,000 cubic feet (248,000 m^{3}) of gas per day, and had a total depth of 4,485 feet (1,367 m). Amerada named the field after the closest town, Rio Vista, and the productive zone the "Emigh". This was the only zone to produce gas until 1943.

Development of the field picked up rapidly during the Second World War. Since oil tankers were being appropriated in the San Francisco Bay Area for use in the war effort, a giant gas pipeline from the Kettleman Hills field had to be converted to an oil pipeline, creating an immediate need for a gas supply closer to the urban center. The timing was perfect, as the Rio Vista field was proving to be enormous as each new well came in, and by the end of November, 1944, there were 70 active gas wells in the new field. Peak production was the next year, with over 160 billion cubic feet (4.5×10^{9} m^{3}) of gas being withdrawn from the field in 1945.

The field was unitized in 1965. Amerada Petroleum became the principal operator, although a few scattered smaller operators remained active on the field, mainly on the outlying portions. In 1969 Amerada Petroleum merged with Hess Oil and Chemical Corporation, acquiring its present name of Amerada Hess Corporation.

Amerada Hess continued to operate much of the field until January 1999, at which time they sold it to Sheridan Energy, Inc. Sheridan only held the field for part of the year, selling it to Calpine Natural Gas Co. (now Calpine Corporation) in October 1999. When Calpine filed for bankruptcy in 2005, Rosetta Resources Inc. formed for the purpose of acquiring the oil and gas resources of Calpine; they took over operation in July 2005, and continue to run the field as of 2010.

Occasional conflicts have occurred over land use in the field. While developers of the 3,000-home Trilogy retirement community north of Rio Vista owned surface rights to the land they intended to use for the planned community, Amerada Hess retained mineral rights, and their successor Calpine desired to drill new gas wells in the same region. As of 2010, only one active well ("Marks No. 7") is adjacent to the community – northeast of State Route 12 at the corner of Church Road and Marks Road.

Because the largely depleted field contains one of the biggest potential underground gas storage reservoirs in the region – 3.6 trillion cubic feet (100 km^{3}) of gas filled a lot of pore space in the source rocks – the field was part of a regional study done by the California Geological Survey to assess the potential value of the area for carbon sequestration. Several gigatons of carbon dioxide could conceivably be pumped into the depleted reservoir, serving three purposes: 1) to offset atmospheric emissions; 2) to assist in natural gas recovery, by increasing reservoir pressure; and 3) to mitigate subsidence of the overlying land, which is slowly collapsing into the vacated space, as is common over depleted petroleum fields.

Gas from the field enters a series of pipelines at six distribution points, with two primary downstream uses: 1) as the supply for Calpine's regional gas-fired power plants, and 2) for storage and distribution via the PG&E network to customers in northern California.
