= Jersey island =

Jersey island may refer to:

- Jersey, one of the Channel Islands
- Jersey Island, California
