= Ida Island =

Island in California

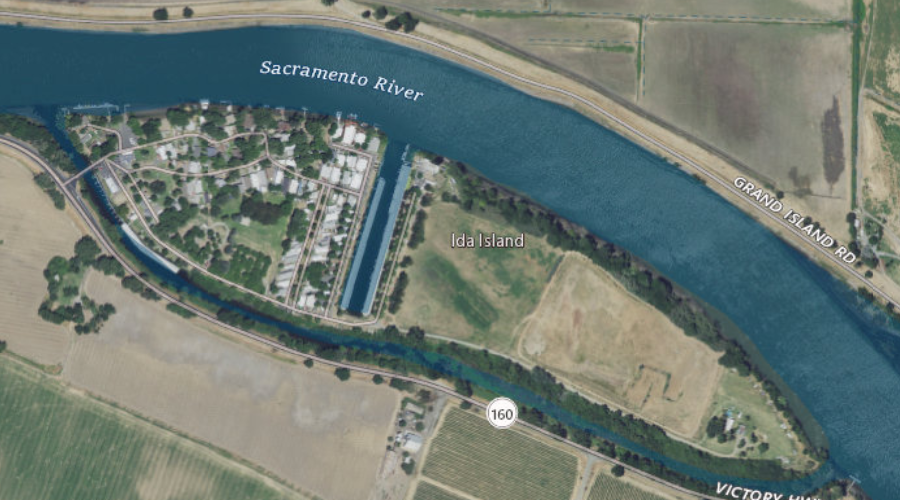
- USGS aerial imagery of Ida Island; on its west end is a bridge to w:Brannan Island on the south, and Grand Island is north across the w:Sacramento River.

- Location within Sacramento-San Joaquin River Delta Location within California Location within the United States

Geography
- Location: Northern California
- Coordinates: 38°10′14″N 121°38′12″W
- Adjacent to: Sacramento–San Joaquin River Delta
- Highest elevation: 3 ft (0.9 m)

Administration
- United States
- State: California
- County: Sacramento

Ida Island (also known as Ida's Isle) is a small island in the Sacramento–San Joaquin River Delta. It is part of Sacramento County, California. Its coordinates are 38°10′14″N 121°38′12″W, and the United States Geological Survey measured its elevation as 3 ft (0.91 m) in 1981. It appears on a 1978 USGS map of the area.
