= Antioch Bombing Target =

Coordinates: 38°3′4.91″N 121°38′43.14″W

{{Merger with Franks Tract State Recreation Area has been proposed. Please see Talk page.}}

The Antioch Bombing Target a 500-acre (200 ha) plot was a United States Navy target used from 1943 to 1952. It is now part of the Franks Tract State Recreation Area.
