= Montezuma Hills =

Region of highlands beside the Sacramento River in southern Solano County, California

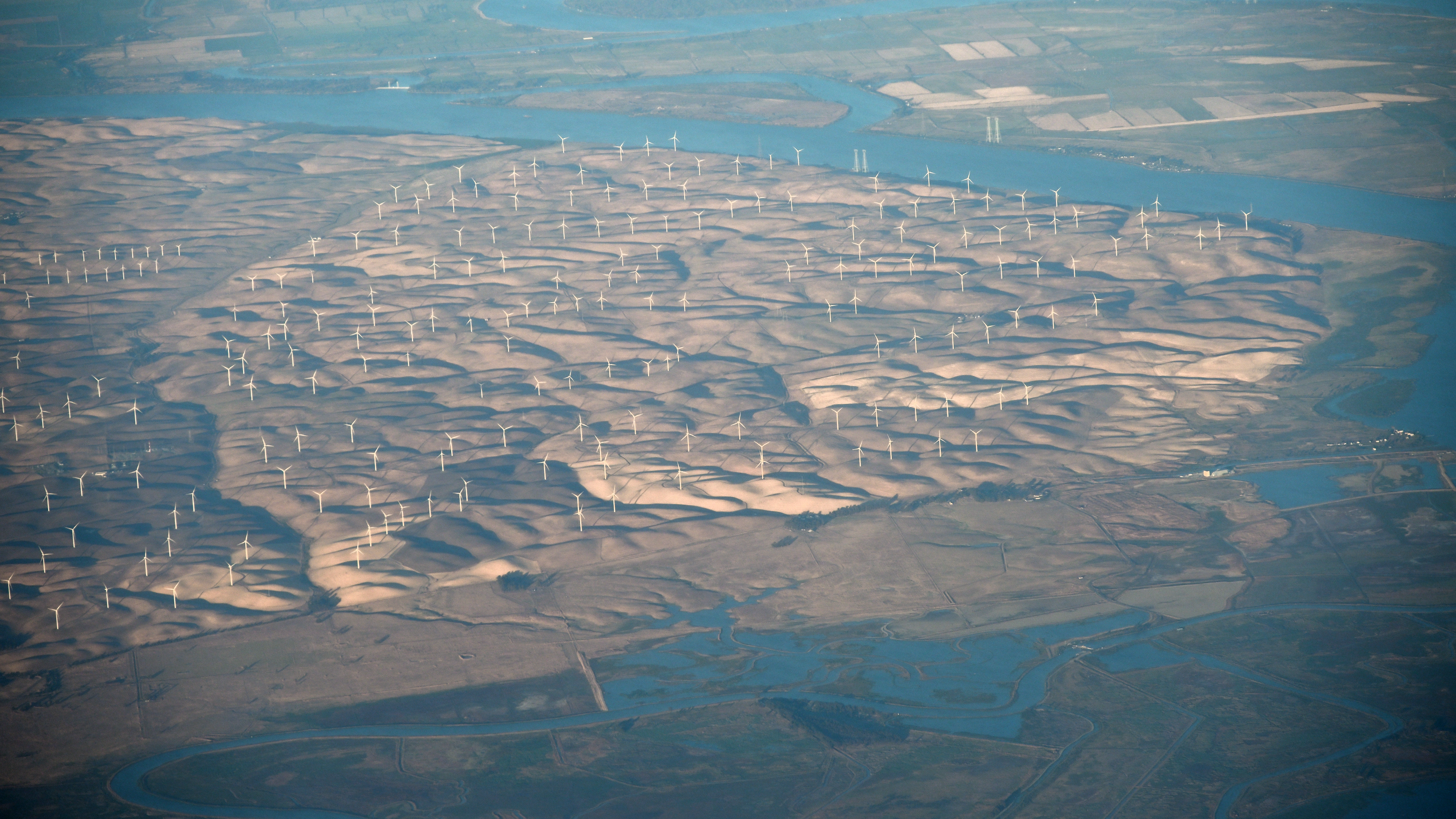
- An aerial photo of the Montezuma Hills

Highest point
- Elevation: 85 m (279 ft)

Geography
- Location within California Location within the United States
- Country: United States
- State: California
- District: Solano County
- Range coordinates: 38°7′2.704″N 121°48′15.845″W
- Topo map: USGS Antioch North

The Montezuma Hills comprise a small range of low-elevation hills at the northern banks of the Sacramento–San Joaquin River Delta and southwestern Sacramento Valley in California in the United States.

== Geography ==
The Montezuma Hills are in southern Solano County, California. They are bounded by the Sacramento River on the south and east, the Montezuma Slough on the west, and roughly by California State Route 12 on the north. Rio Vista is the nearest city, and Travis Air Force Base is about 10 miles northwest of the Montezuma Hills. They are north across the Sacramento River from Antioch and Pittsburg, and 40 miles (64 km) northeast of San Francisco.

The summits of these rolling hills vary in height from about 164–279 feet (50–85 m). The hills are known for their exceptional wind energy resource potential which has made them the site of the rapidly expanding Shiloh Wind Power Plant, a wind farm that now comprises hundreds of wind turbines, with another 88 pending approval.

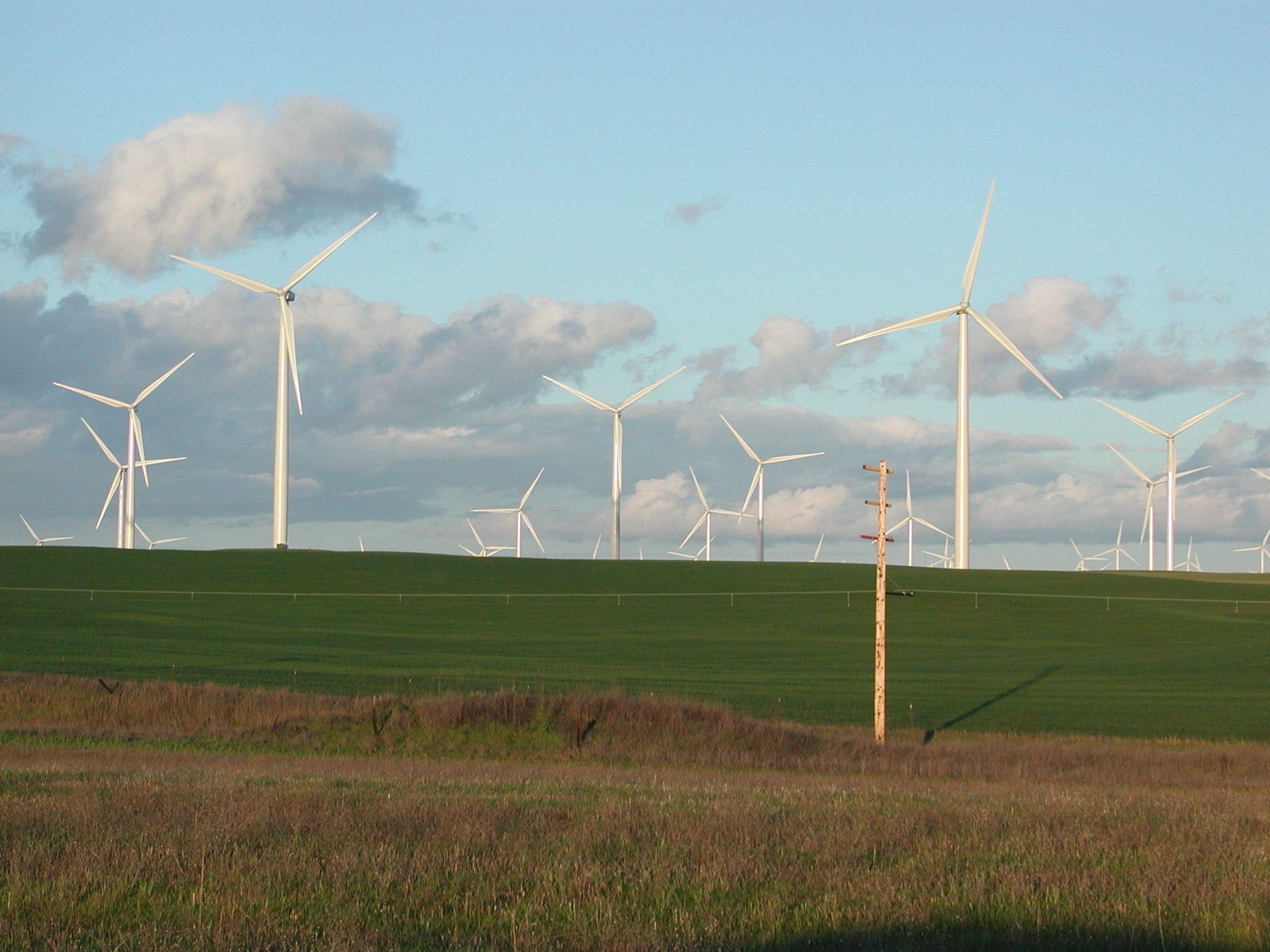
A 21st-century windfarm in the Montezuma Hills, Solano County, California. Some of these wind turbines are 415 ft tall.

== Natural features ==
The flora and fauna of the Montezuma Hills has been studied extensively beginning in 1988 with the Earth Metrics Environmental Impact Report for proposed wind energy development. and continuing with subsequent analyses that collectively have led to a comprehensive characterization of the local biological resources, plant communities and wildlife habitat.

In general there is little remaining native vegetation in the Montezuma Hills due to the historic intensive grazing. As of 2010, land uses are primarily dryland farming, sheep grazing, and energy, including natural gas production – the Rio Vista Gas Field underlies much of the Montezuma Hills – and wind energy. Wetlands cover only a small percentage of the Montezuma Hills, and virtually all of the sparse trees are non-native species associated with the area's farming homesteads.

Compared to the Suisun Marsh to the south and west, the Montezuma Hills have a relatively unabundant diversity of birds and other wildlife. Among the Montezuma Hills are a number of intermittent drainage swales that flow during winter months; otherwise the monotypic dryland farms support even less diversity of wildlife than more agriculturally diverse land uses to the north. Exceptions to the dearth of wildlife are the considerable populations of ground squirrels and other small rodents, which populations in turn support modest numbers of raptors. Birds present in moderate numbers are the red-winged blackbird, cliff swallow, northern harrier and barn swallow. Moderate numbers of avian nests have been documented in the Montezuma Hills including red-tailed hawk, American kestrel and historic nests of the golden eagle.
