= Webb Tract =

Island in California

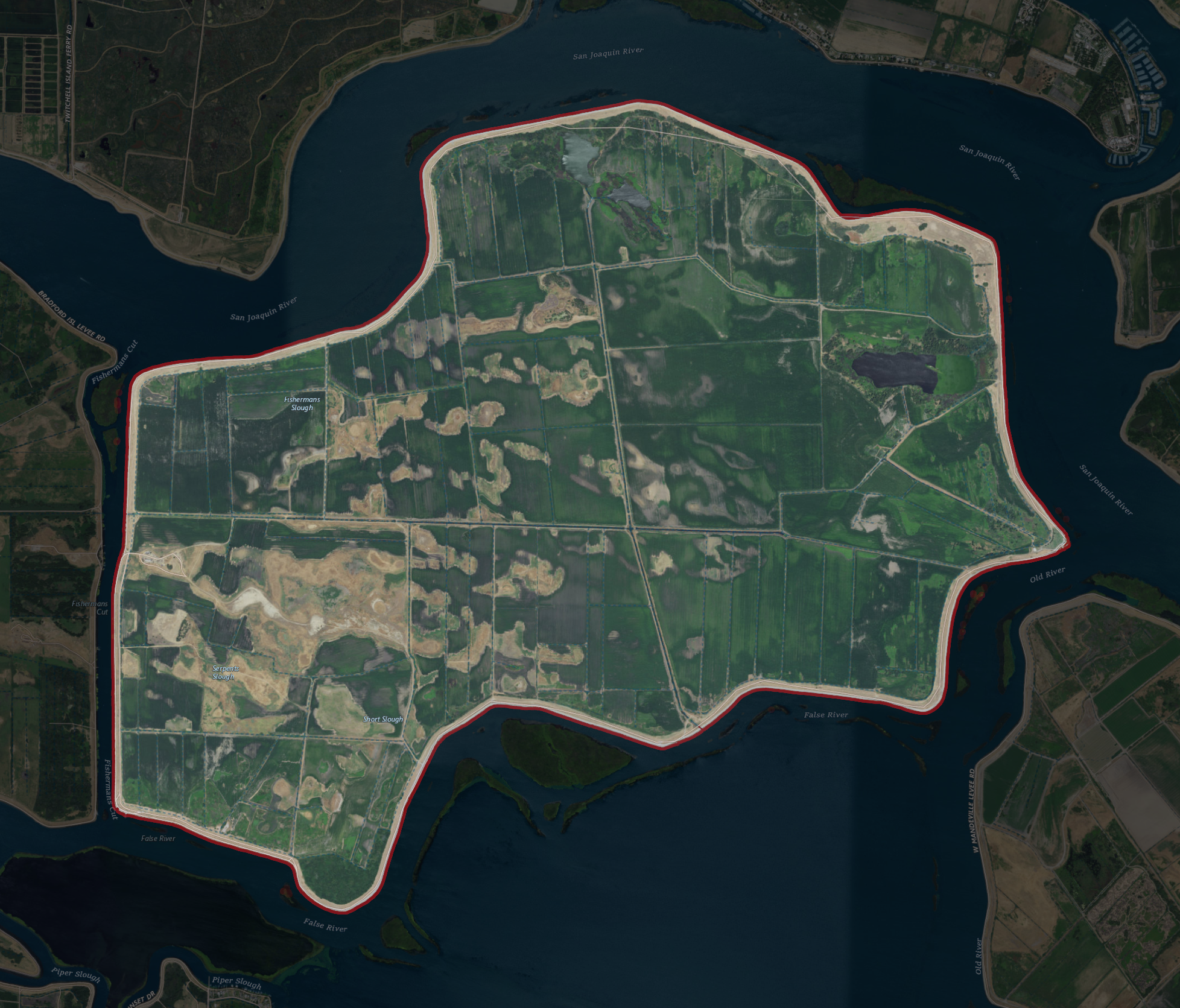
- USGS aerial imagery of the Webb Tract

- Location within Sacramento-San Joaquin River Delta Location within California Location within the United States

Geography
- Location: Northern California
- Coordinates: 38°04′47″N 121°36′32″W
- Adjacent to: Sacramento–San Joaquin River Delta
- Highest elevation: −13 ft (-4 m)

Administration
- United States
- State: California
- County: Contra Costa

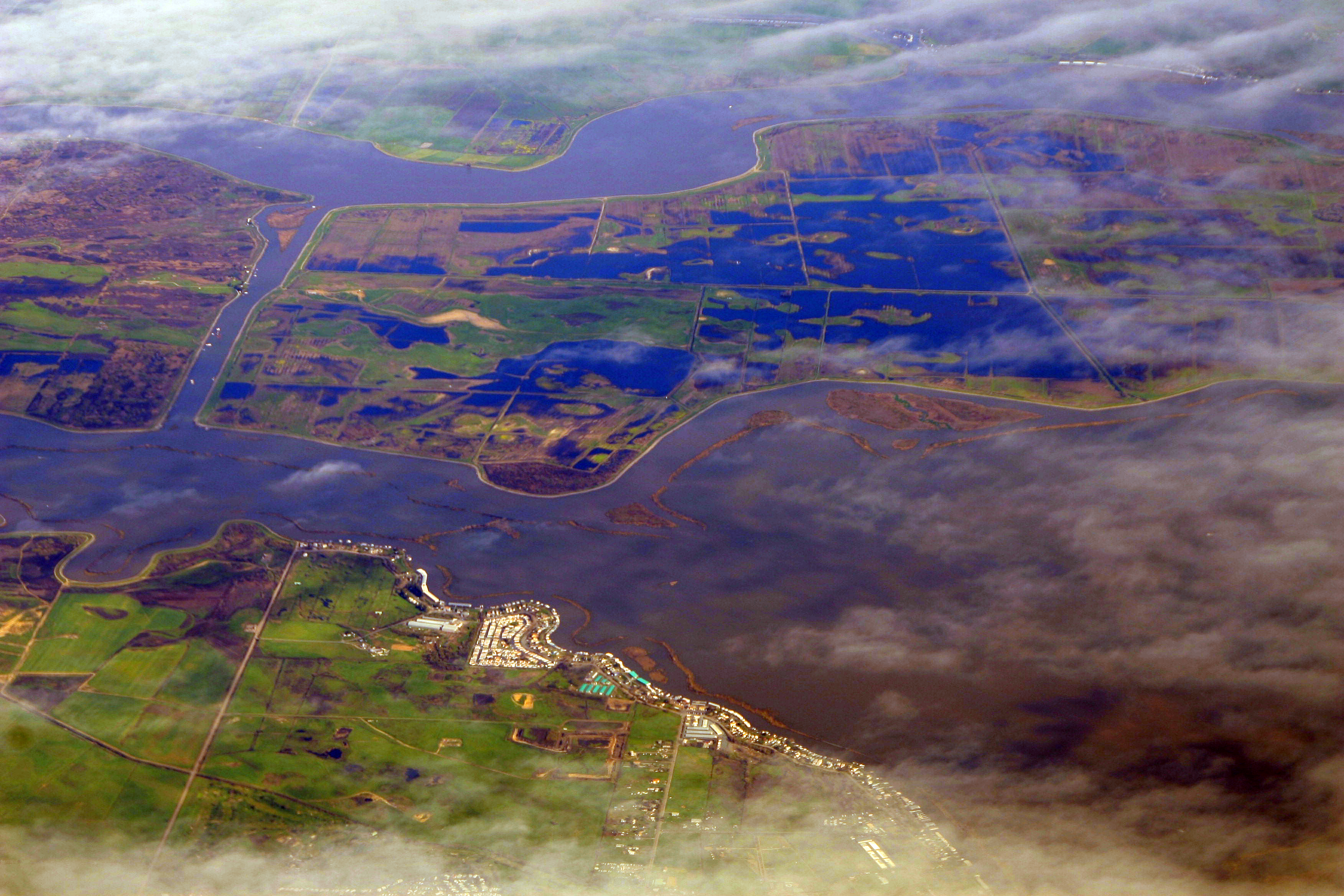
Bradford Island (left), Webb Tract (right) and Bethel Island (bottom) in 2009

The Webb Tract is an island in the Sacramento–San Joaquin River Delta. It is part of Contra Costa County, California, and managed by Reclamation District 2026. The United States Geological Survey measured its elevation as −13 ft (−4.0 m) in 1981. The Metropolitan Water District of Southern California purchased the island in 2016.
