= Franks Tract State Recreation Area =

State park unit of California, United States

Coordinates: 38°02′56″N 121°38′16″W

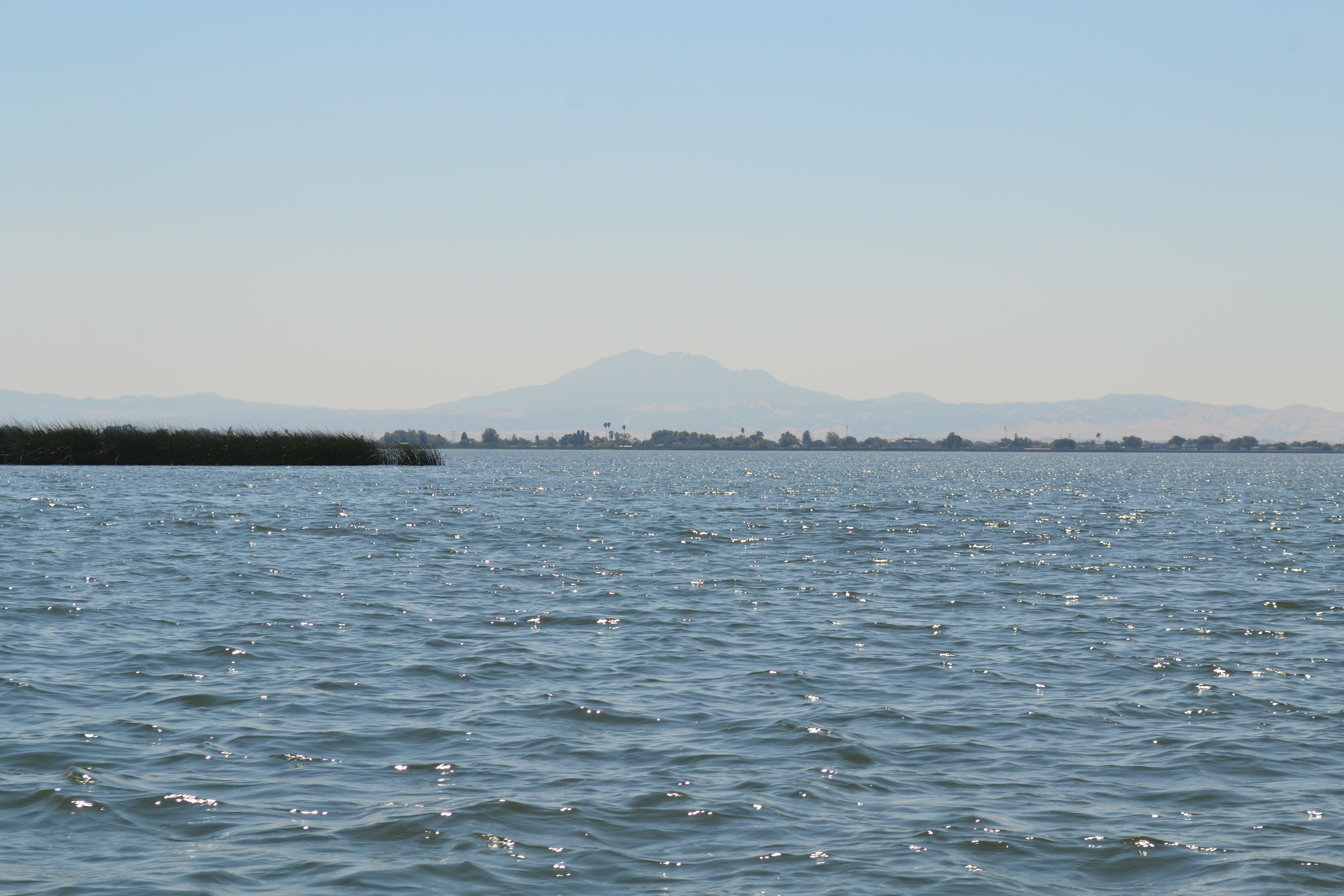
- Franks Tract with Mount Diablo in the background
- Interactive map of Franks Tract State Recreation Area
- Location: Sacramento-San Joaquin Delta
- Nearest city: Oakley, California
- Designation: State Recreation Area
- Designated: 1959
- Owner: California Department of Parks and Recreation

Franks Tract State Recreation Area (SRA) is a state park unit of California, United States, featuring a flooded area in the Sacramento–San Joaquin River Delta. It is accessible only by water. Franks Tract, and a smaller adjoining submerged property called "Little Franks Tract", are situated between the False River and Bethel Island. The recreation area is used primarily for fishing and waterfowl hunting, because of its exposure to frequent strong winds and fluctuating water levels. In times of high water, the entire site can be submerged except for portions of the old levees. The 3,523-acre (1,426 ha) park was established in 1959. It is managed from nearby Brannan Island State Recreation Area, 6 miles (9.7 km) to the northwest.

== History ==
Franks Tract was once the United States' second-largest source of peat, after the Everglades. Located along the San Joaquin River, about 11 miles (18 km) east of Antioch, California, the site was originally reclaimed between 1902 and 1906 and owned by Dr. N.K. Foster and F.C. Franks. It was then used for growing potatoes, beans, asparagus, sugar beets, onions, seed crops, small grains and corn. Fred C. Franks and his wife deeded a half interest of Division D to John Markley and his wife Ada R. on March 29, 1913. In February 1937, Franks Tract was inundated, but was reclaimed by October. However, in February 1938 the False River levee broke and Franks Tract was flooded and never reclaimed. The Regents of the University of California, Berkeley owned Division D, containing 502.25 acres, according to a November 23, 1943 property map. The Little Franks Tract was last flooded in 1982, and no attempt was ever made to restore it as farmland. The United States Navy used a 500-acre (200 ha) portion of the area as a bombing target known as Antioch Bombing Target from 1943 to 1952.

== Wildlife ==
Because of the tract's location in the Pacific Flyway, a large variety of waterfowl inhabit it, especially during the fall and winter. Year round species include gulls, great blue herons, terns, swallows, crows, blackbirds, cormorants and kingfishers. Hunting on the open water is allowed, subject to California Fish & Wildlife Department (CDFWD) regulations. Permits and other arrangements must be made in advance through the Brannan Island State Recreation Area.

== Franks Tract restoration project ==
=== CDFWD plan and assessment ===
The CDFWD has been studying ways to modify the Franks Tract to accomplish several objectives, namely: "...improve habitat for the Delta smelt, reduce saltwater intrusion into the central and south Delta, reduce submerged aquatic weeds and reduce invasive nonnative fish species that feed on native fish like the salmon and the Delta smelt." The study and report were completed by Moffatt & Nichol, a consulting firm retained by the Metropolitan Water District of Southern California (MWD).

CDFWD presented its final draft of its project feasibility study at a meeting of the Delta Stewardship Council in Sacramento on June 29, 2018. The study concluded that "... the project is both feasible and expensive." The plan is premised on splitting the Franks Tract with a berm that runs north and south, then filling the property west of the berm (including the Little Franks Tract) to create about 1,000 acres (4,000,000 m^{2}) of wetlands. The east side of the berm would face 2,000 acres (8,100,000 m^{2}) of open channel. This would permanently block access to False River and the Sacramento River from the Franks Tract and Bethel Island. The project's cost was estimated at $300 to $600 million.

=== Local objections and concerns ===
CDFWD released a draft of its report in March, 2018. Everyone who attended these meetings who returned comments objected to the plan. Some of these were:

- The objective of removing all non-native species from the Delta included driving out black bass, which moved in during the 1938 flooding. This species has thrived in Franks Tract and has become a favorite attraction for fishermen. According to Jan McCleery, the president of the Save the California Delta Alliance, Bethel Island hosts bass fishing tournaments nearly every weekend during the summer, with each event reportedly generating $200,000 income for the community.
- Access to "fast water" is a major factor affecting property values along the Delta. The proposal would eliminate this access for existing boat docks and marinas at Bethel Island, likely forcing them to rebuild elsewhere. It would also have a major impact on Discovery Bay, reducing values of existing homes there.

== Franks Tract gallery ==
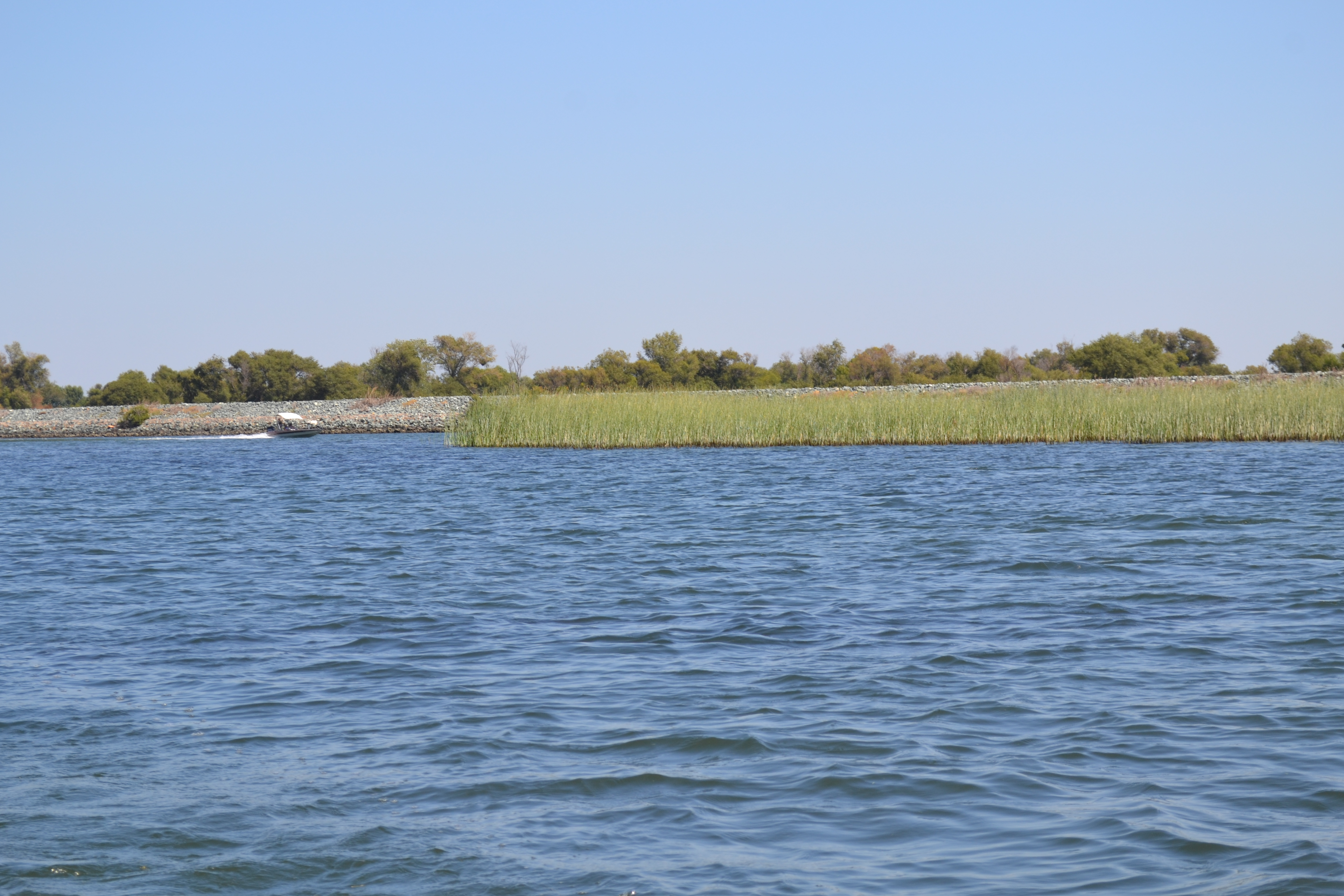

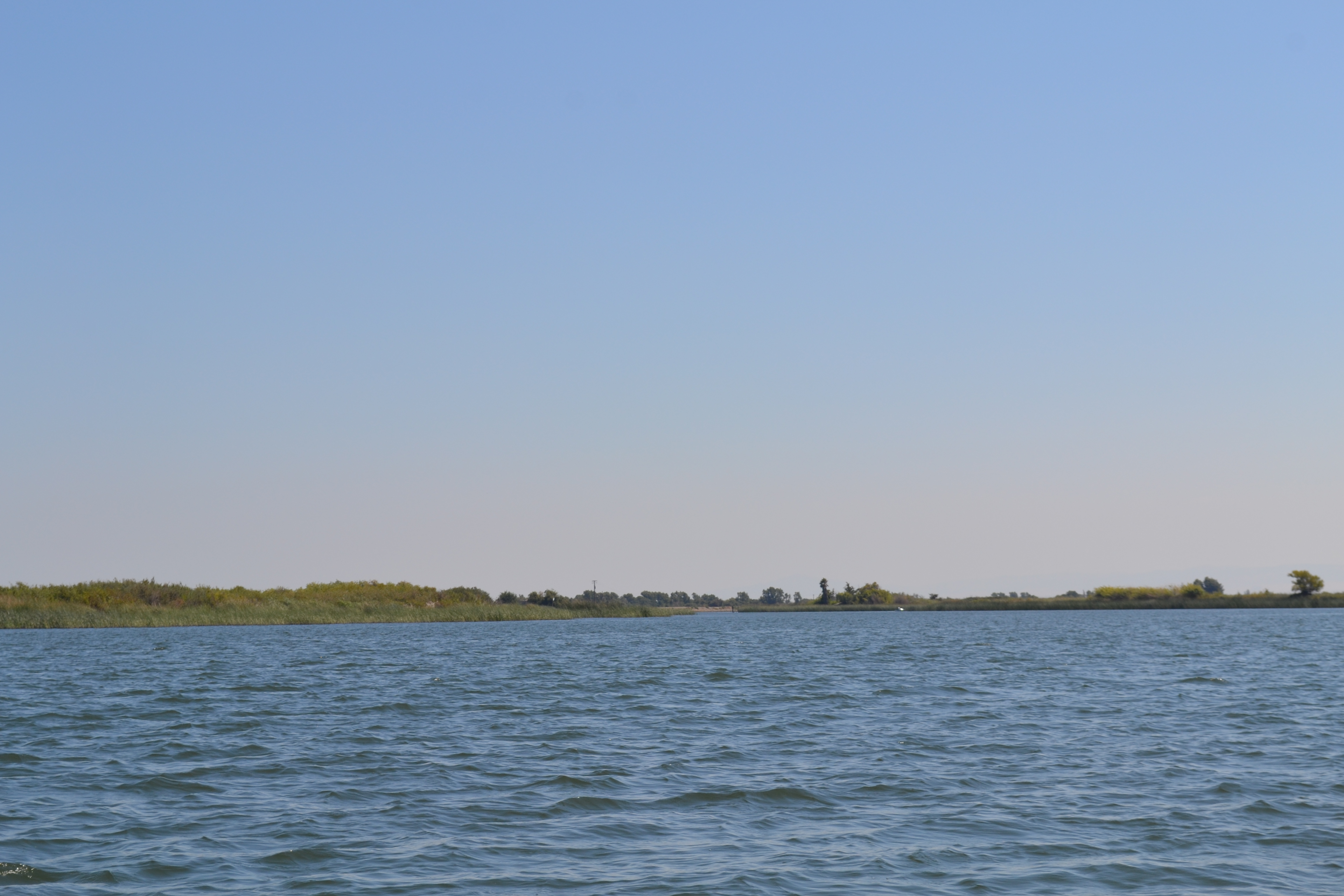

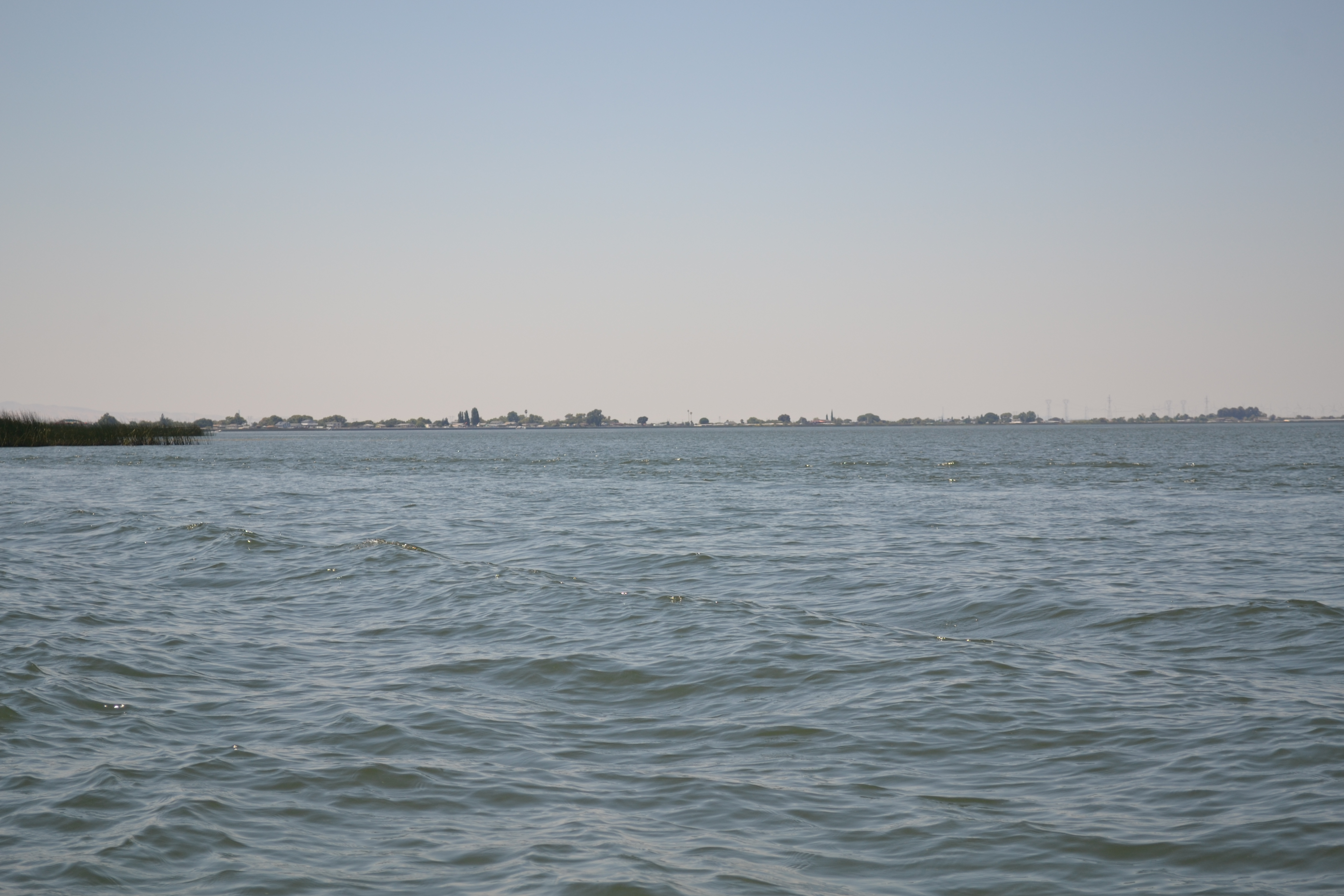

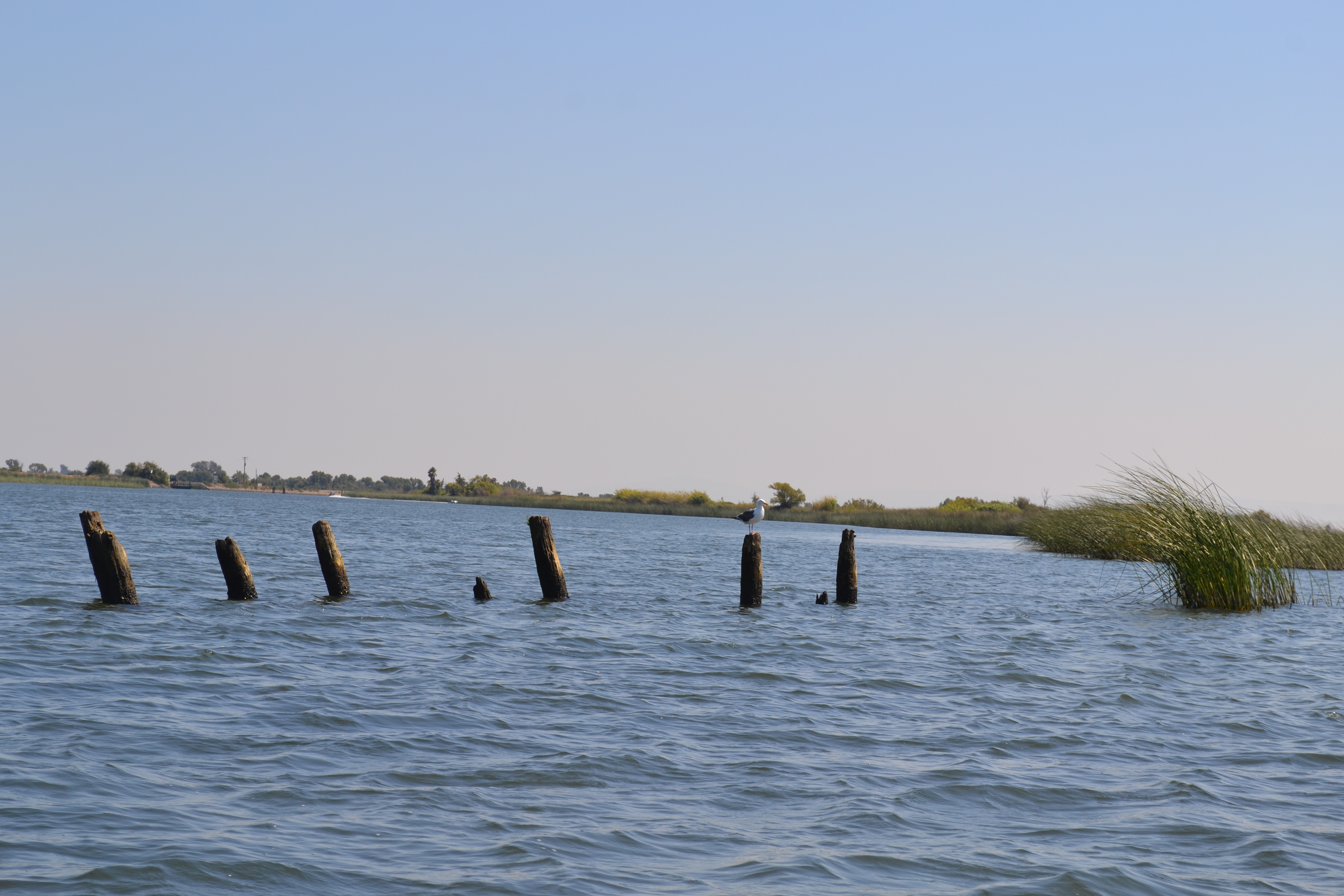

== See also ==
- List of California state parks
