= Twitchell Island =

Island in Sacramento County, California

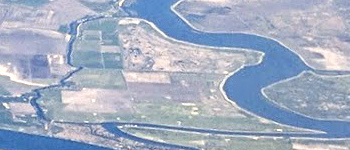
- Twitchell Island in an aerial photo taken looking toward the east in 2018.

- Location within Sacramento-San Joaquin River Delta Location within San Francisco Bay Area Location within California Location within the United States

Geography
- Location: Northern California
- Coordinates: 38.109641°N 121.648565°W
- Adjacent to: Sacramento-San Joaquin River Delta
- Area: 3,000 acres (1,200 ha)
- Highest elevation: −2 ft (-0.6 m)

Administration
- United States
- State: California
- County: Sacramento
- City: Isleton

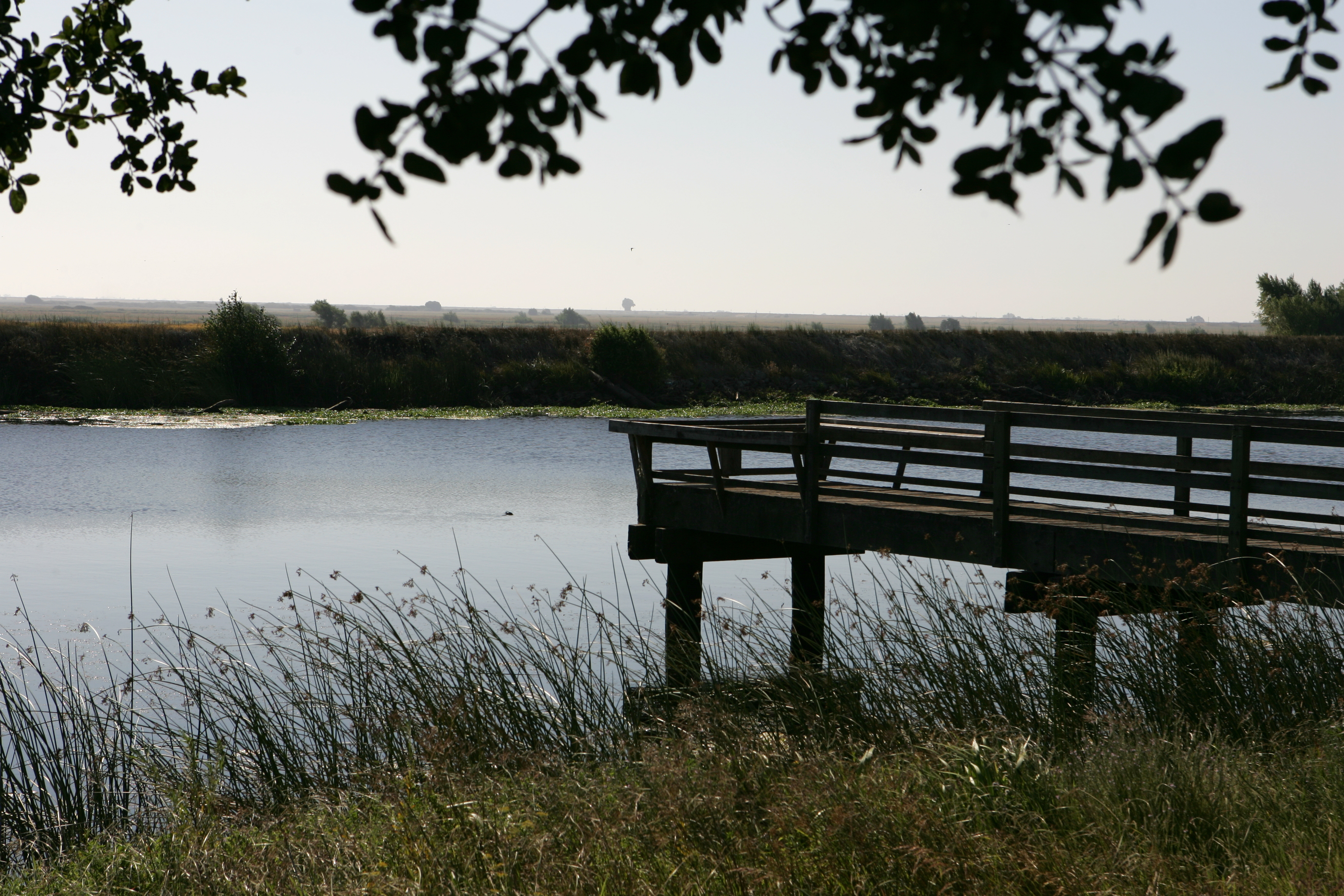
A photo taken on Twitchell Island in 2006.

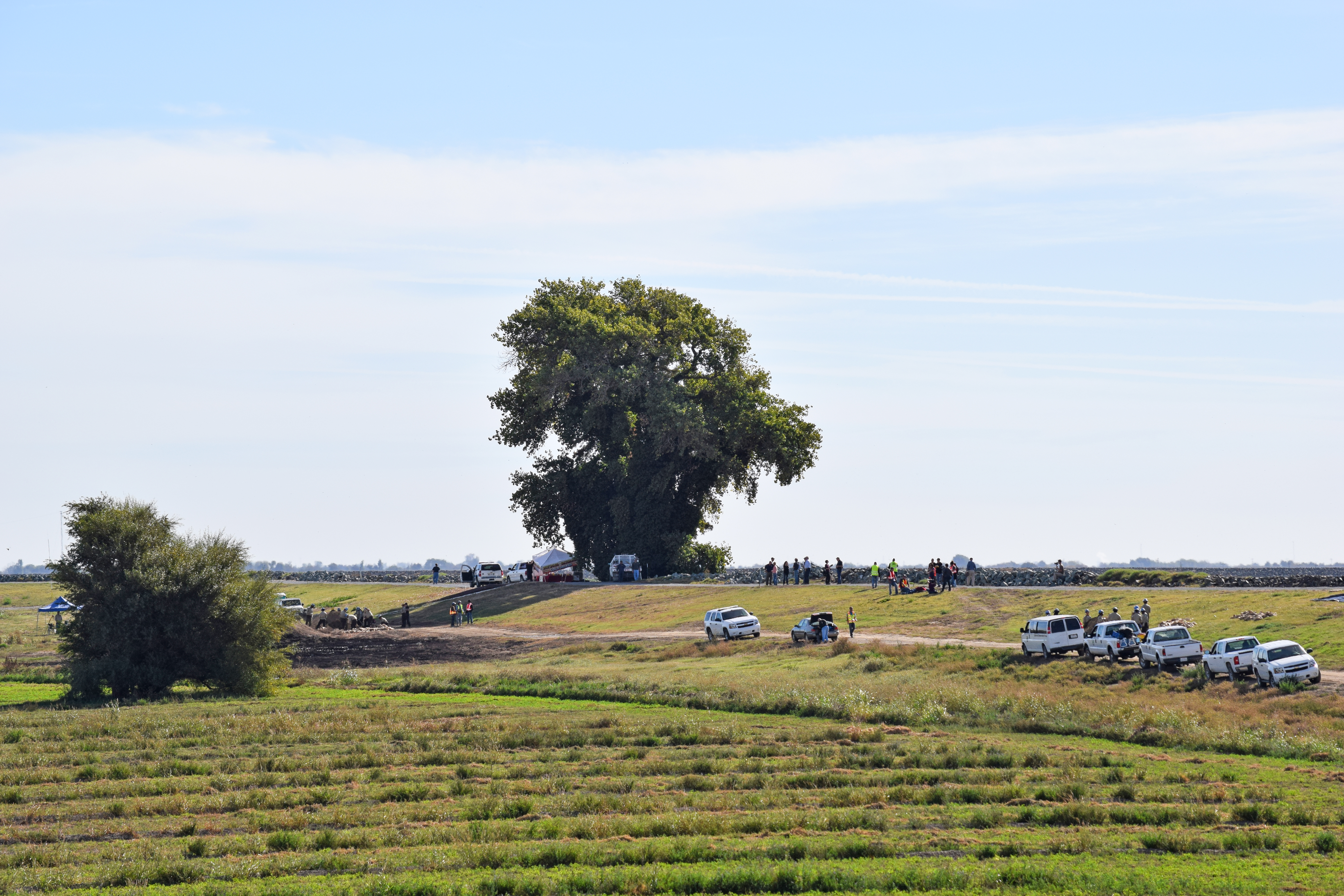
An Army Corps of Engineers flood emergency exercise Oct. 22, 2014, on Twitchell Island.

Twitchell Island is an island in the Sacramento-San Joaquin River Delta in Sacramento County, California, 35 kilometres (22 miles) southwest of Sacramento. At 2 metres (6.6 feet) below sea level, the 1,200 ha (3,000-acre) is bounded on the north by Seven Mile Slough, on the east and south by the San Joaquin River, and on the west by Three Mile Slough. The island is entirely within the Rio Vista Gas Field, although well pads and associated infrastructure make up only a small part of its land use. It is managed by Reclamation District 1601.

Twitchell is eighty-five percent owned by the State of California.

Twitchell Island is the site of an experiment being conducted by the U.S. Geological Survey to study whether growing tules and cattails on the sinking islands of the Sacramento Delta can reverse the soil loss caused by wind, rain and farming. The soil under the 15-acre (6.1-hectare) site has risen 1 to 2 feet (0.30–0.61 metres) since the project started in 1996. The plants not only help rebuild the level of the soil, but sequester quite a bit of carbon as well.

== See also ==
- List of islands of California

== Bibliography ==
- "Twitchell Island Levees". GEI Consultants. 2009.
