= Jersey Island =

Island in northern California, United States

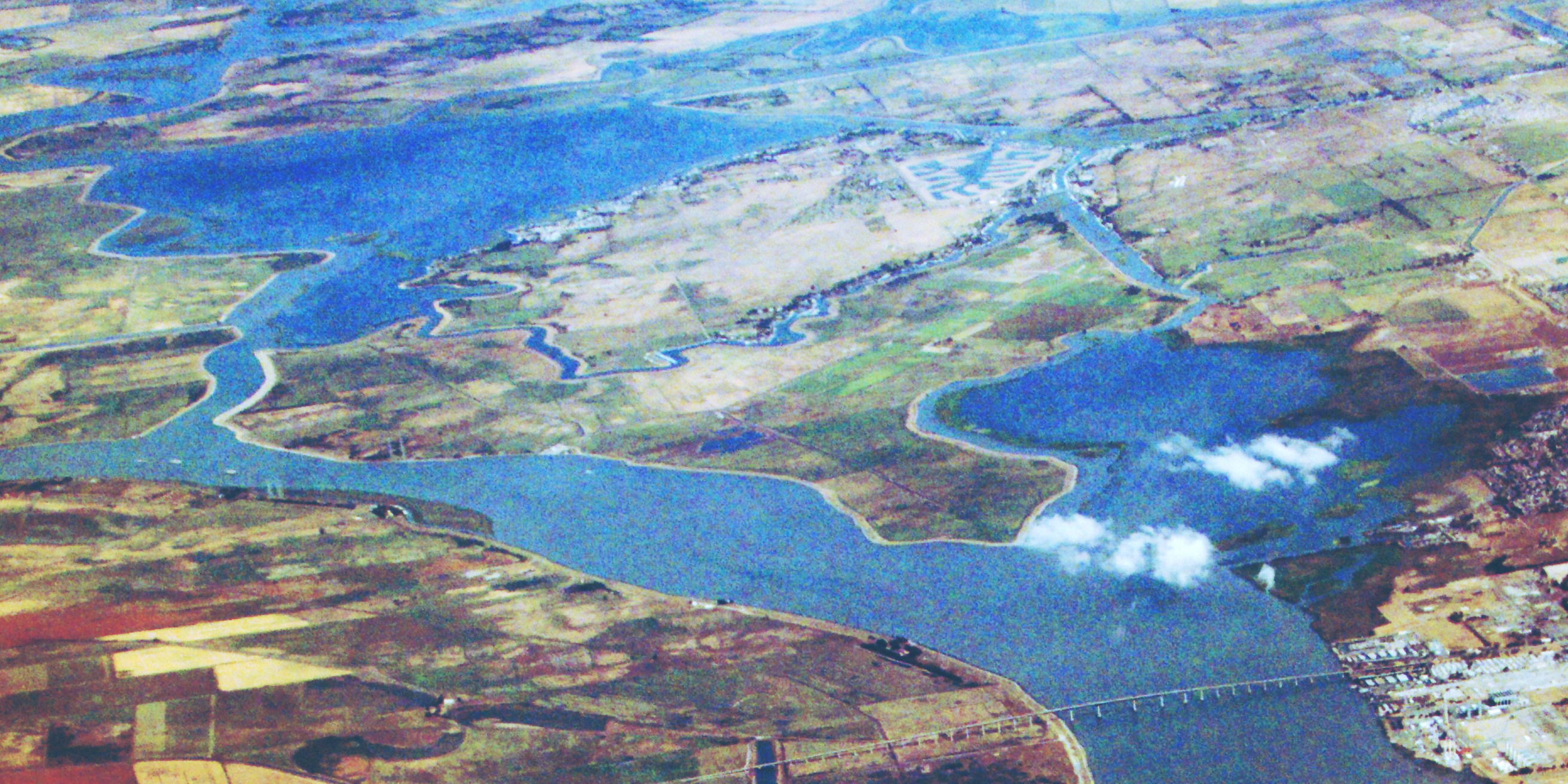
- Jersey Island is the top-center island in this aerial photo, with Sherman Island to its left/bottom and Antioch to its right/bottom.

- Location within Sacramento-San Joaquin River Delta Location within San Francisco Bay Area Location within California Location within the United States

Geography
- Location: Northern California
- Coordinates: 38.036310°N 121.685787°W
- Adjacent to: Sacramento-San Joaquin River Delta
- Area: 3,520 acres (1,420 ha)

Administration
- United States
- State: California
- County: Contra Costa

Jersey Island is an island in the Sacramento-San Joaquin River Delta of Contra Costa County, California, approximately 10 kilometres (6.2 mi) east of Antioch. The 1,425-hectare (3,520-acre) island is bounded on the west by the San Joaquin River-Stockton Deepwater Shipping Channel, on the north by the False River, on the northeast by Piper Slough, on the east by Taylor Slough, and on the south by Dutch Slough. It is administered by Reclamation District 830.

== See also ==
- Islands of California
