= Brannan Island =

Island in California

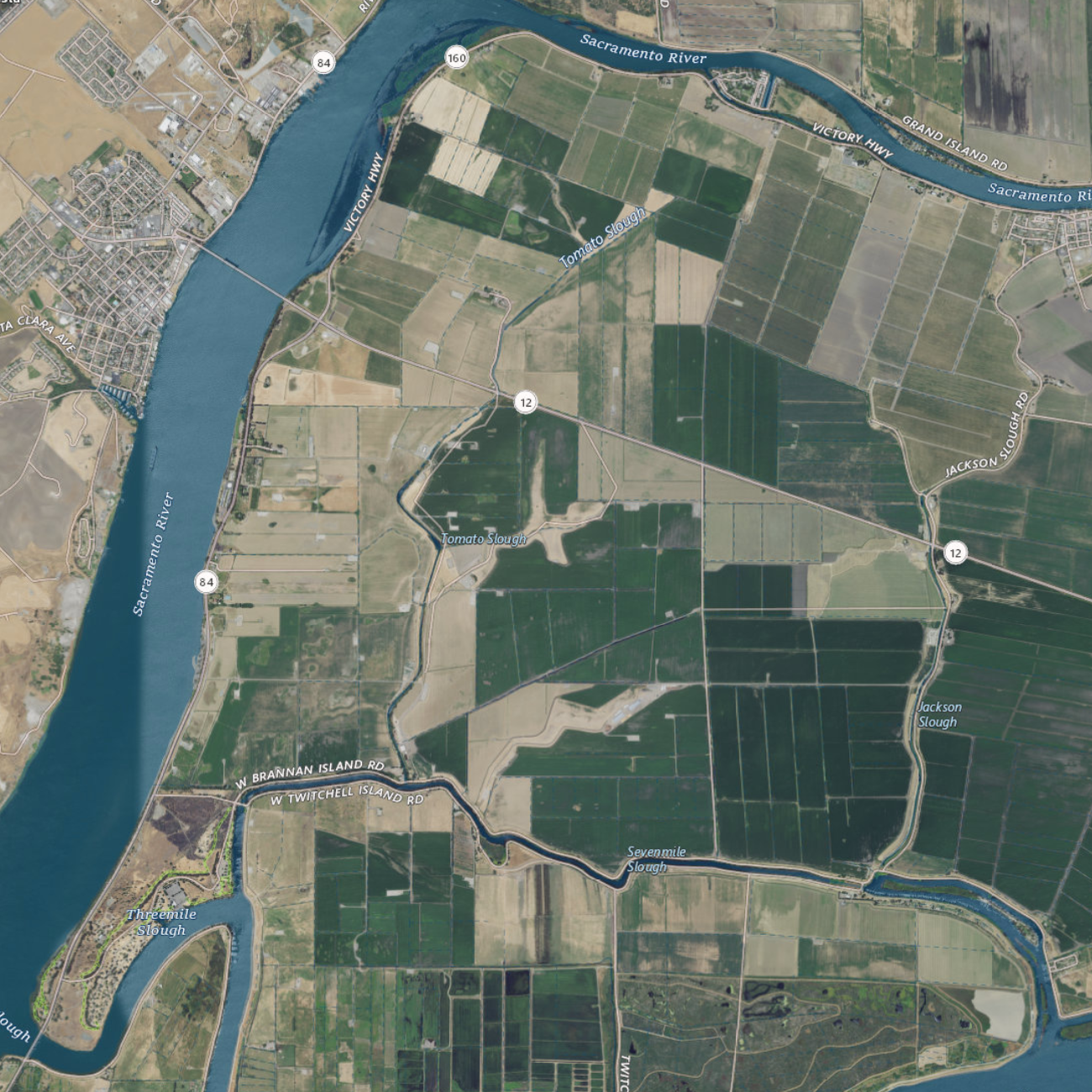
- USGS aerial imagery of Brannan Island

- Location within Sacramento-San Joaquin River Delta Location within California Location within the United States

Geography
- Location: Northern California
- Coordinates: 38°07′19″N 121°38′37″W
- Adjacent to: Sacramento–San Joaquin River Delta
- Highest elevation: −13 ft (-4 m)

Administration
- United States
- State: California
- County: Sacramento

Brannan Island is a small island in the Sacramento–San Joaquin River Delta. It is part of Sacramento County, California, and is managed by Reclamation District 2067. Its coordinates are 38°07′19″N 121°38′37″W, and the United States Geological Survey measured its elevation as −13 ft (−4.0 m) in 1981. A "Brannan Island", with the same location but a slightly different shape, is labeled on an 1850 survey map of the San Francisco Bay area made by Cadwalader Ringgold as well as an 1854 map of the area by Henry Lange.
