= Dutton Island =

Island in California

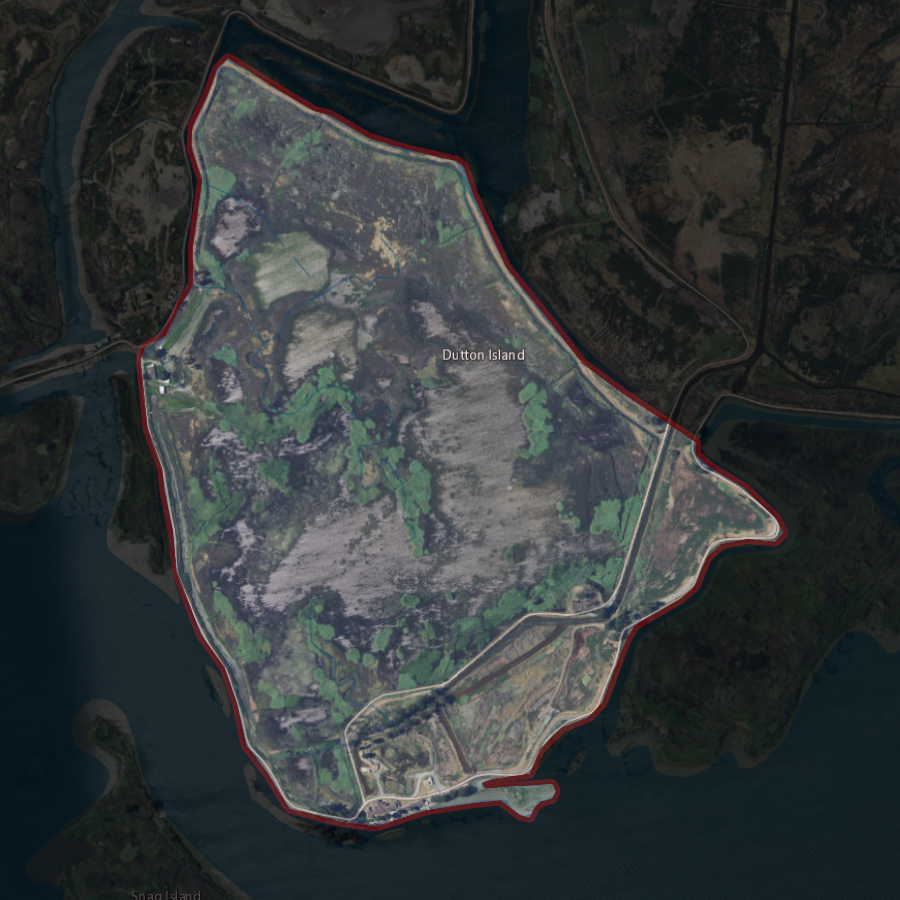
- USGS aerial imagery of Dutton Island.

- Location within Sacramento-San Joaquin River Delta Location within San Francisco Bay Area Location within California Location within the United States

Geography
- Location: Northern California
- Coordinates: 38°04′54″N 121°58′14″W
- Adjacent to: Suisun Bay

Administration
- United States
- State: California
- County: Solano

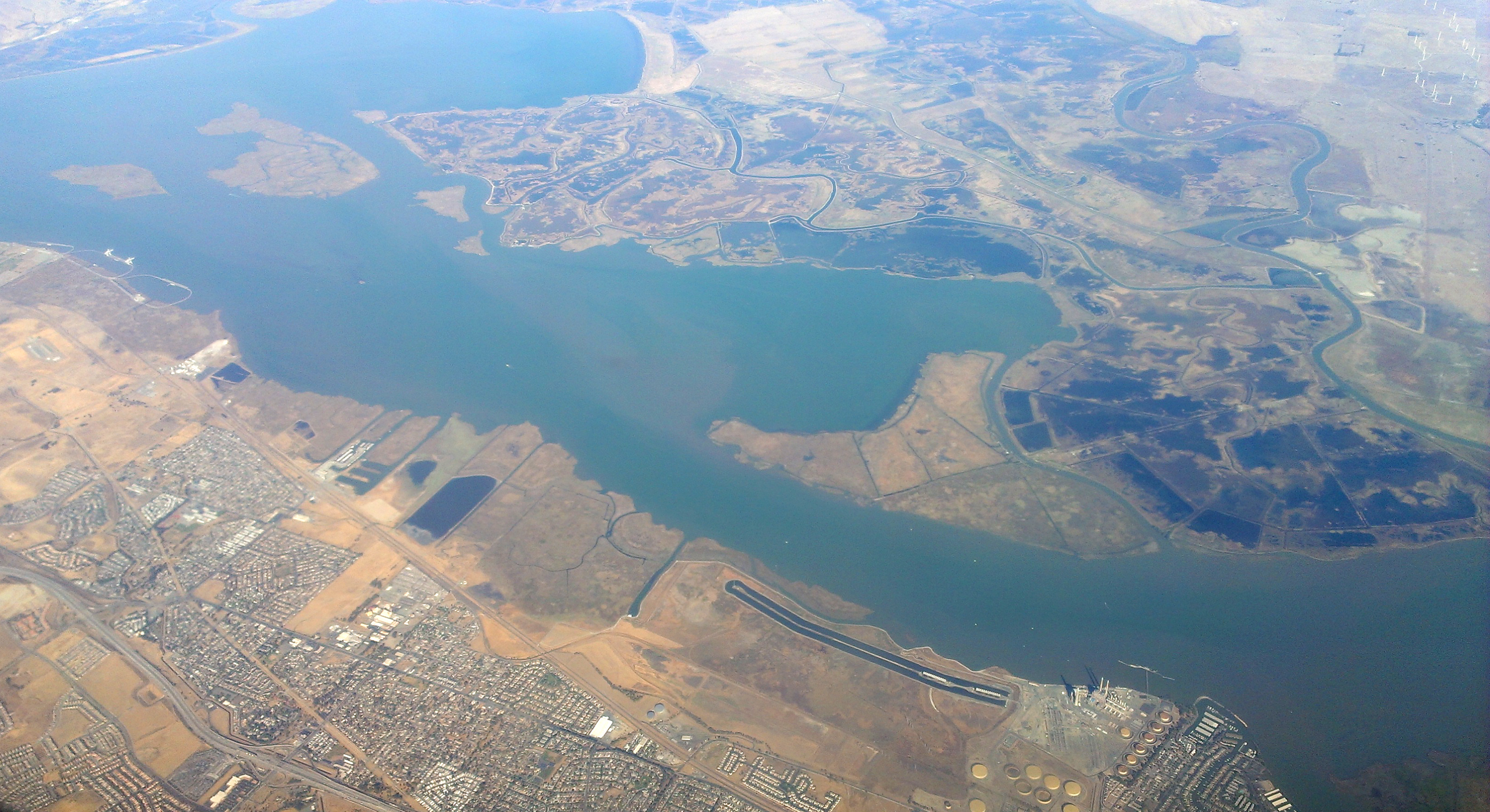
A 2015 aerial photo of Grizzly Bay taken from the southeast; Dutton Island can be seen near the center, with Wheeler Island to the north and east, Simmons Island to the west, and Honker Bay to the south.

Dutton Island is a small island in Suisun Bay, California. It is part of Solano County, and included within Reclamation District 2127. Its coordinates are 38°04′54″N 121°58′14″W. An 1850 survey map of the San Francisco Bay area made by Cadwalader Ringgold, as well as an 1854 map of the area by Henry Lange, shows an unlabeled island covering some of the area now occupied by Dutton Island.
