= Van Sickle Island =

Island in California

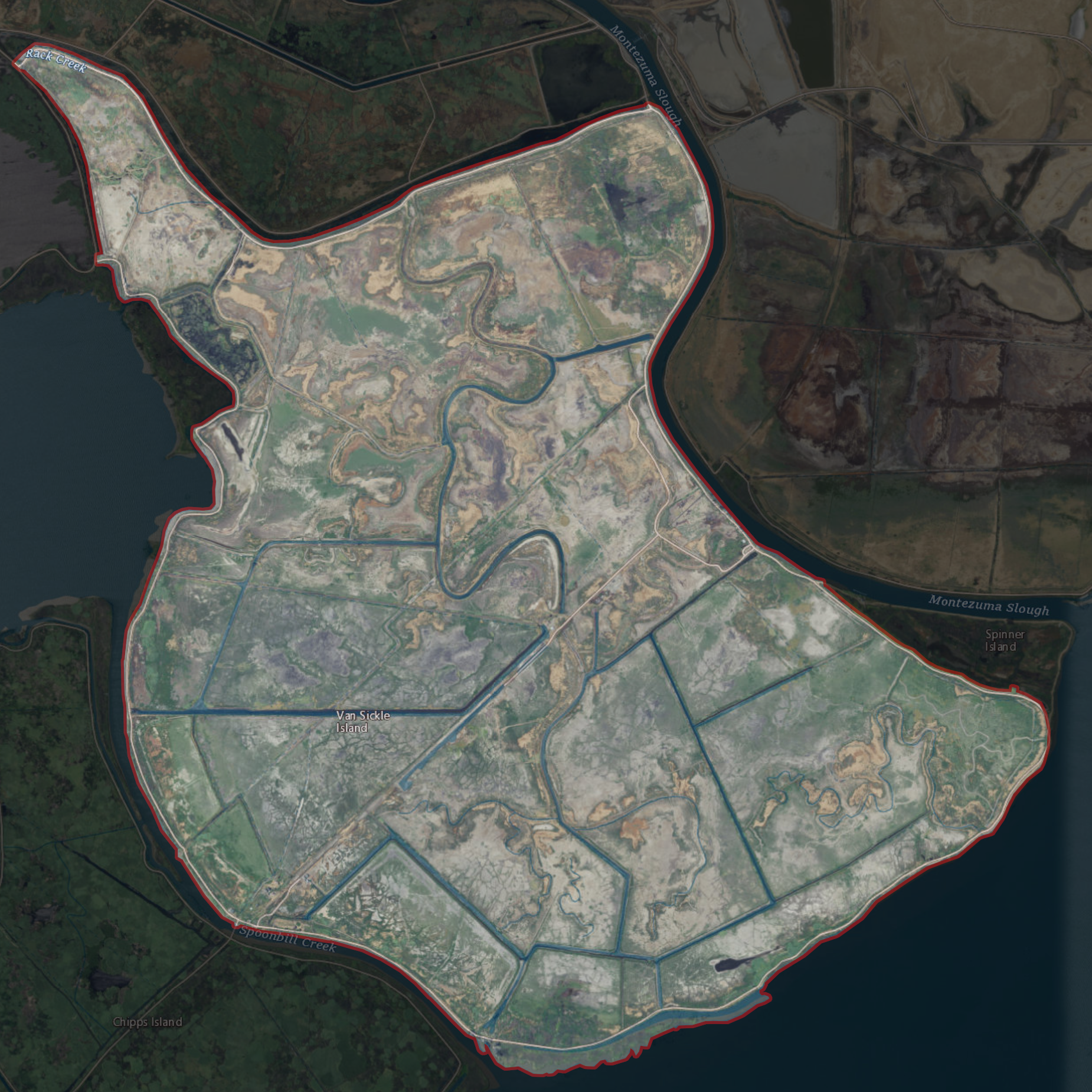
- United States Geological Survey aerial imagery of Van Sickle Island

- Location within Sacramento-San Joaquin River Delta Location within San Francisco Bay Area Location within California Location within the United States

Geography
- Location: Northern California
- Coordinates: 38°04′00″N 121°54′04″W
- Adjacent to: Suisun Bay
- Area: 10,000 acres (4,000 ha)
- Highest elevation: 0 ft (0 m)

Administration
- United States
- State: California
- County: Solano

Demographics
- Population: 22 (2009)

Van Sickle Island is an approximately 10,000-acre (4,000 ha) island in Suisun Bay, California. It is part of Solano County, and administered by Reclamation District 1607. Its coordinates are 38°04′00″N 121°54′04″W, and in 1981 the United States Geological Survey recorded its elevation as 0 ft (0 m). The island's land is divided into 22 privately owned parcels, used primarily for duck clubs and private residences. A railroad bridge constructed in 1913 once connected it to Montezuma and Chipps Island, from which a ferry connected to Mallard Island and Pittsburg. The rail service was discontinued and the bridges no longer exist; currently, the island is accessible by water, as well as by road on bridges from Hammond Island and Wheeler Island.

== Geography and ecology ==
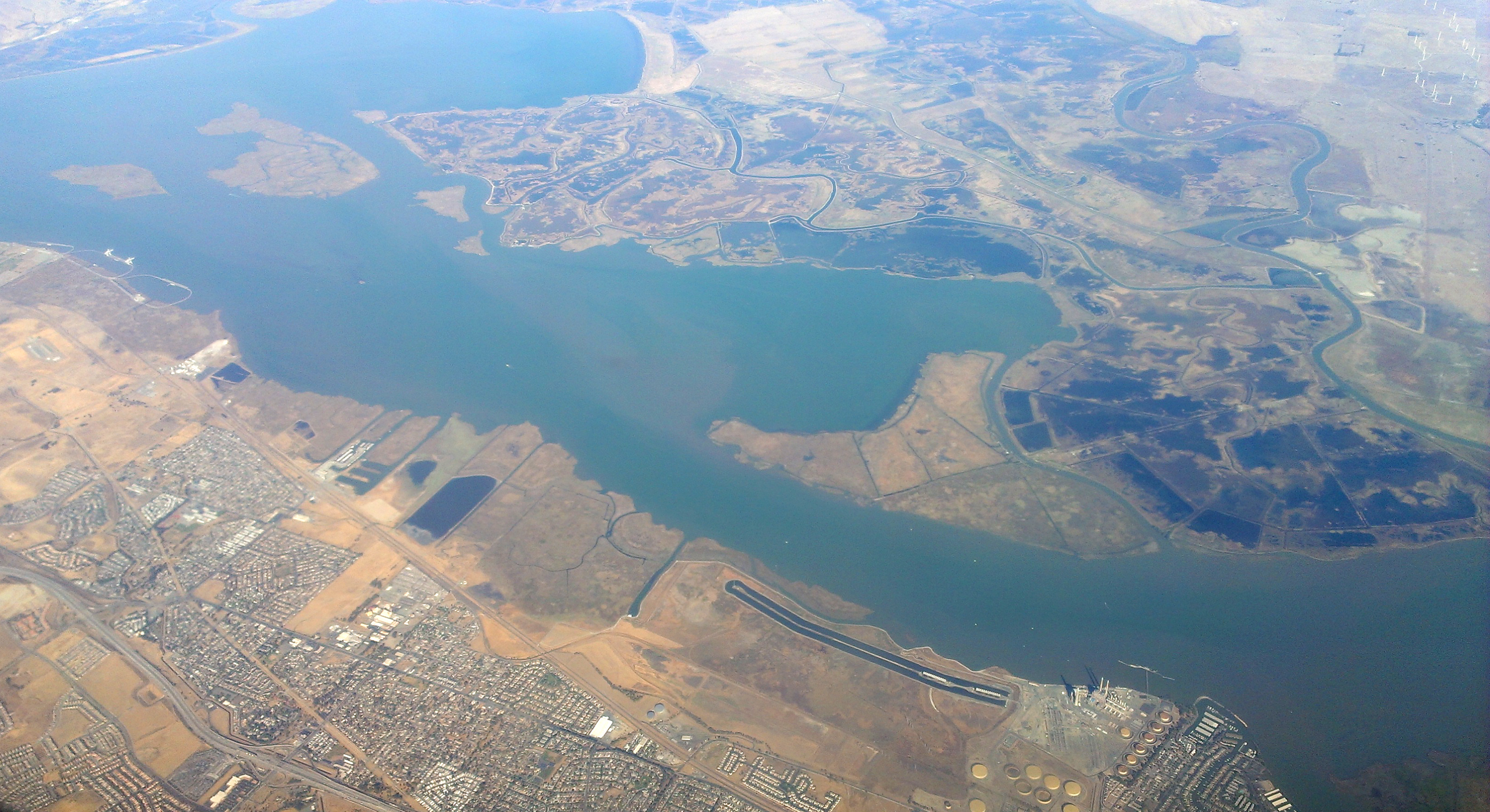
A 2015 aerial photo of Grizzly Bay taken from the southeast; Van Sickle Island is furthest to the right.

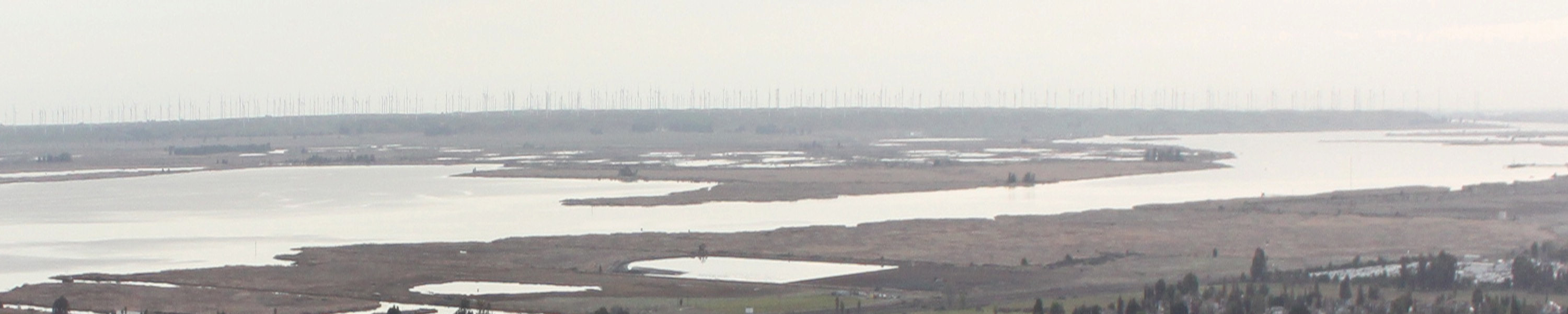
A photo taken in 2021, from Bay Point (in foreground), showing Suisun Bay, Chipps Island, and Van Sickle Island. The wind farms of Montezuma Hills can be seen in the background, to the north.

Van Sickle Island is located in Suisun Bay, an embayment of San Francisco Bay in Northern California. It is on the eastern edge of Suisun Marsh, at the terminus of Montezuma Slough, among a number of marsh islands separated primarily by creeks and sloughs. Van Sickle Island contains 2,400 acres (970 ha) of managed wetlands. It is within the Grizzly Island Unit of the primary management area defined in 1976 by the San Francisco Bay Conversation and Development Commission's Suisun Marsh Protection Plan, which says that "despite the private nature of this use and the restricted number with access to the Marsh, club owners provide a public benefit in the maintenance of the waterfowl and wildlife habitat".

It is bordered on the north by Hammond Island (across Roaring River Slough), on the northwest by Wheeler Island, on the west by Honker Bay (itself an embayment of Suisun Bay), on the southwest by Chipps Island (across Spoonbill Creek), on the south and southeast by Suisun Bay, on the east by Montezuma (across Montezuma Slough), and on the northeast by Spinner Island.

One bridge connects the levee road at the northeast corner of Van Sickle Island to the levee road on Hammond Island, which can be reached by automobile from mainland via Grizzly Island. Another two connect to Wheeler Island on the northwest corner, both to the same road; the southern end of this road travels west across Wheeler Island and eventually recedes into the water, while the northern end connects to Hammond Island. On the eastern tip of Van Sickle Island, two levee roads connect to Spinner Island (which has no mainland road access).

By 2009, 22 people lived on Van Sickle Island, which was divided among 22 parcels; in 2017, it was home to "around 20" duck clubs. A 2009 report prepared for the Solano Local Agency Formation Commission said that there were "no expectations for growth or development of the island".

== History ==
Like many islands and tracts of land in Suisun Bay and the Sacramento–San Joaquin River Delta, Van Sickle Island was reclaimed in the mid-19th century by dredging sloughs and using the material to construct levees. Water inside the levees was then drained, resulting in a large tract of fertile land that was used for raising cattle, as well as farming beans and tules.

The cost of levee maintenance, however, gradually increased to the point of making farming unprofitable; subsequently, the area "became a haven for waterfowl hunting and recreation".

The island, historically, was referred to by a number of names, including "Jones Island", "Van Sickle Island", "Van Sickles Island" and "Van Sickle's Island". It is shown as "Jones Island" on an 1850 survey map of the San Francisco Bay area made by Cadwalader Ringgold, as well as an 1854 map made by Henry Lange. However, an 1891 decision by the Board on Geographic Names Decisions established its name as Van Sickle Island.

=== Reclamation district ===
On November 25, 1914, Reclamation District 1607 was established to handle drainage, irrigation, and levee maintenance. The island was subdivided into several parcels, upon which landowners pay assessments to fund District operations. The district is governed by a five-member Board of Trustees, elected by the landowners to serve 4-year terms. The Board meets several times per year, and members are not compensated for their roles. In addition to Board members, the district has two part-time employees: a secretary who performs some routine levee inspections, and another who coordinates various levee maintenance activities.

In the 21st century, the reclamation district generates its revenue primarily from assessments, in which landowners pay an annual fee of $10 per acre ($2,471 per square kilometre), and grants from other governmental agencies, including the California Department of Water Resources.

Yearly revenues for Reclamation District 1607
Year	Assess- ments	Rents, leases, concessions & royalties	Invest- ment earnings	Inter- govt. (federal)	Inter- govt. (state)	Inter- govt. (other)	Other revenue	Total
2003								$239,400
2004								$900,773
2005								$387,007
2006								$529,994
2007								$489,231
2008								$556,389
2009								$353,870
2010								$340,822
2011								$160,317
2012								$933,704
2013								$193,601
2014								$155,817
2015								$224,796
2016								$234,024
2017	$178,779	$50,480	$740		$23,184			$253,183
2018	$98,698	$50,480	$681	$22,332	$580,792		$125	$753,108
2019	$138,450	$50,480	$3,205	$188,756	$110,661	$29,916	$10	$521,478
Average	$138,642	$50,480	$1,542	$70,363	$238,212	$9,972	$45	$425,147.88

In 2018, an effort remained ongoing to find a buyer for the island; negotiations had stalled with the Department of Water Resources, and several private equity firms had signed nondisclosure agreements but not made offers.

In August 2019, the reclamation district had not raised its assessment fees since 1998.

=== Levees ===
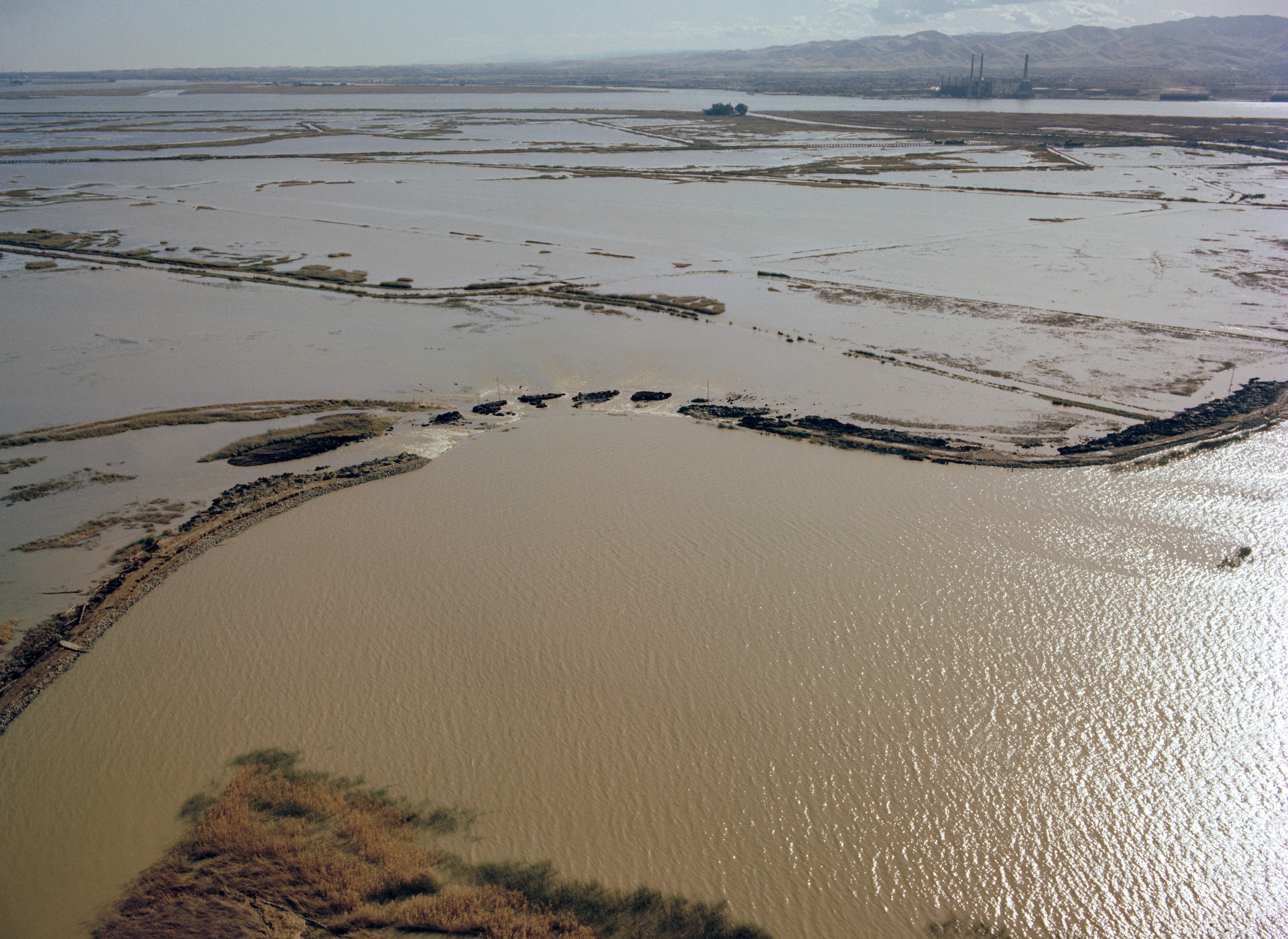
An aerial photo of Van Sickle Island, looking south, after a levee failure in December 1983

There are 12 miles of levees surrounding Van Sickle Island; in 2009, there were three pumping stations used to drain the island of water, both due to deliberate flooding (performed for waterfowl management) and unintentional flooding (due to extreme wind or tidal fluctuations). Of these pumps, one was owned by RD 1607, and two were owned privately.

The levees on Van Sickle Island have been overrun and breached numerous times; in 1914, 2,500 acres (1,000 ha) of grain were ruined when the levees broke.

In December 1983, levee breaches were responsible for multiple floods in the Delta, including Bradford Island; Van Sickle Island was inundated completely.

In January 1997, severe storms in California caused a major disaster declaration on January 4; Reclamation District 1607 submitted Damage Survey Reports to the Federal Emergency Management Agency for $46,788 of levee repair and other associated tasks.

In January 2005, a winter storm subjected parts of the San Francisco Bay Area to winds of nearly sixty miles per hour (97 km/h); this wind combined with heavy rain to cause a levee breach on Van Sickle Island on January 7.

In January 2017, a king tide was caused by the syzygy of the Sun, Earth and Moon; 20 to 30 miles (32 to 48 km) of levees in the Suisun Marsh sustained heavy damage as a result. Steve Chappell, the executive director of the Suisun Resource Conservation District, described the damage to Van Sickle Island's levees as "the worst" affected; on January 12, one large breach overran 1,000 feet (300 m) of them, and the island flooded within hours.

In September 2020, the Board authorized $40,000 to be spent on repairing levees adjacent to the Sacramento River, $22,400 on a pump project at the River Dog Duck Club, and $24,500 for a canal gate replacement near the Hit & Miss Club. Up to $40,000 was also approved for repairs on the Honker Bay levee, which sustained heavy damage in the 2017 floods and had not been repaired since.

=== Sacramento Northern Railway ===
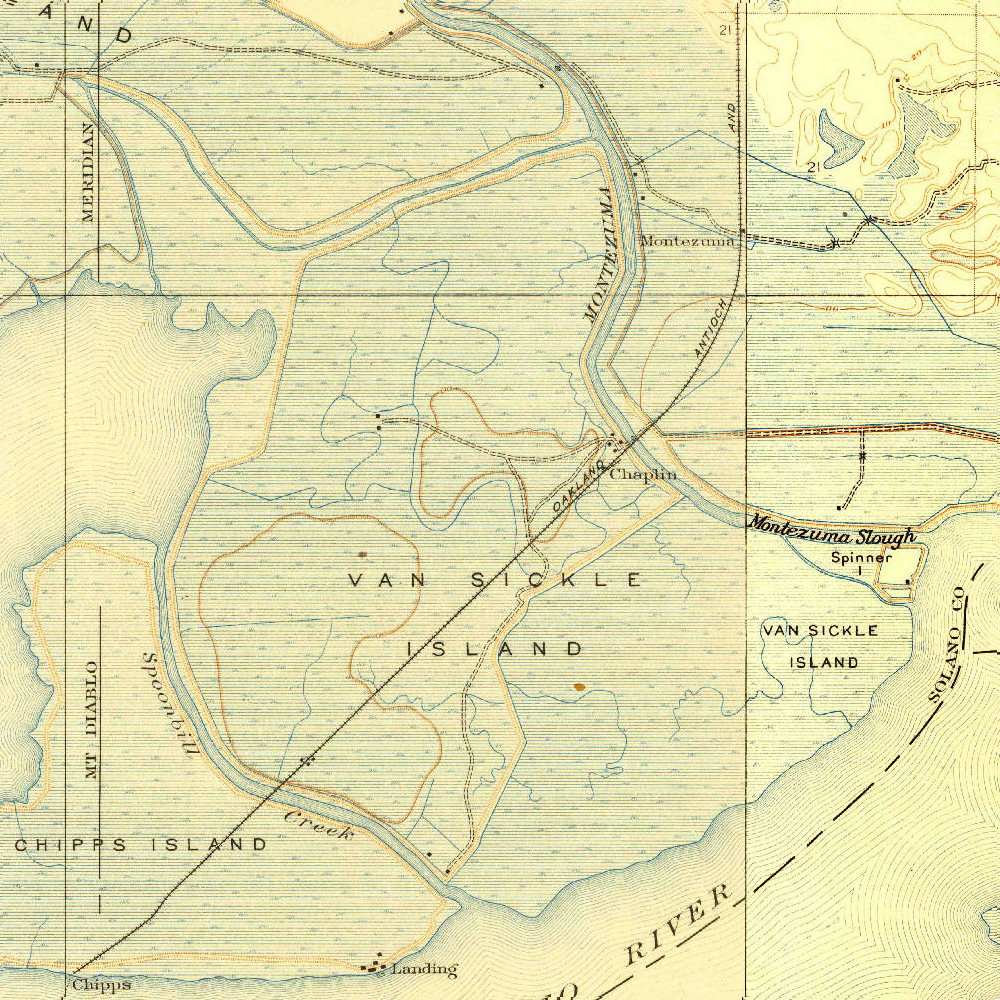
Van Sickle Island in a 1918 USGS survey map.

The Oakland, Antioch and Eastern railway, incorporated in 1913, constructed an electrified railroad from Oakland to Sacramento. While a bridge was planned to cross Suisun Bay, this plan never materialized; a wooden ferry "Bridgit" was constructed in 1913 (and replaced by an all-steel ferry "Ramon" in 1915), which moved trains between West Pittburg and Chipps Island. Directly to the north, trains crossed Van Sickle Island on a long trestle between Chipps and the Montezuma stop. The railway would later be absorbed into the Sacramento Northern Railway, which continued to operate on the route passing through Van Sickle Island.

Passenger service would continue until 1941, and freight service would continue to pass through Van Sickle Island until April 7, 1954, when the "Ramon" ferry was decommissioned. Trains to Sacramento were subsequently routed through the Atchison, Topeka and Santa Fe Railway from Pittsburg to Stockton. Today, the vast majority of Sacramento Northern railway lies dormant, including the trackage on Van Sickle Island; the rail bridges connecting it to Montezuma and Chipps Island no longer exist.

== See also ==
- List of islands of California
