= Joice Island =

Island in California

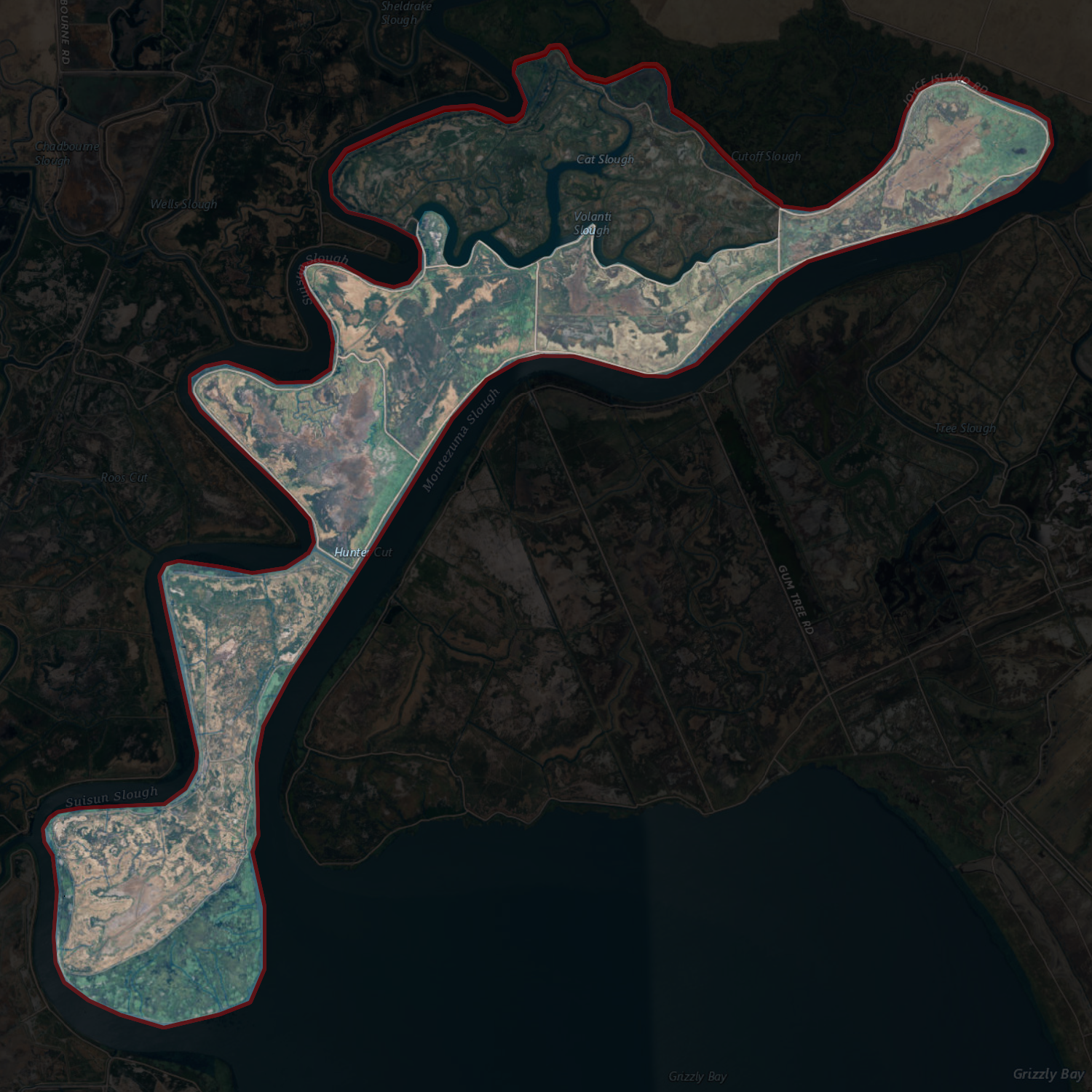
- USGS aerial imagery of Joice Island, with proposed addition to reclamation district 2141 partially shaded at top.

- Location within Sacramento-San Joaquin River Delta Location within San Francisco Bay Area Location within California Location within the United States

Geography
- Location: Northern California
- Coordinates: 38°09′00″N 122°03′34″W
- Adjacent to: Suisun Bay

Administration
- United States
- State: California
- County: Solano

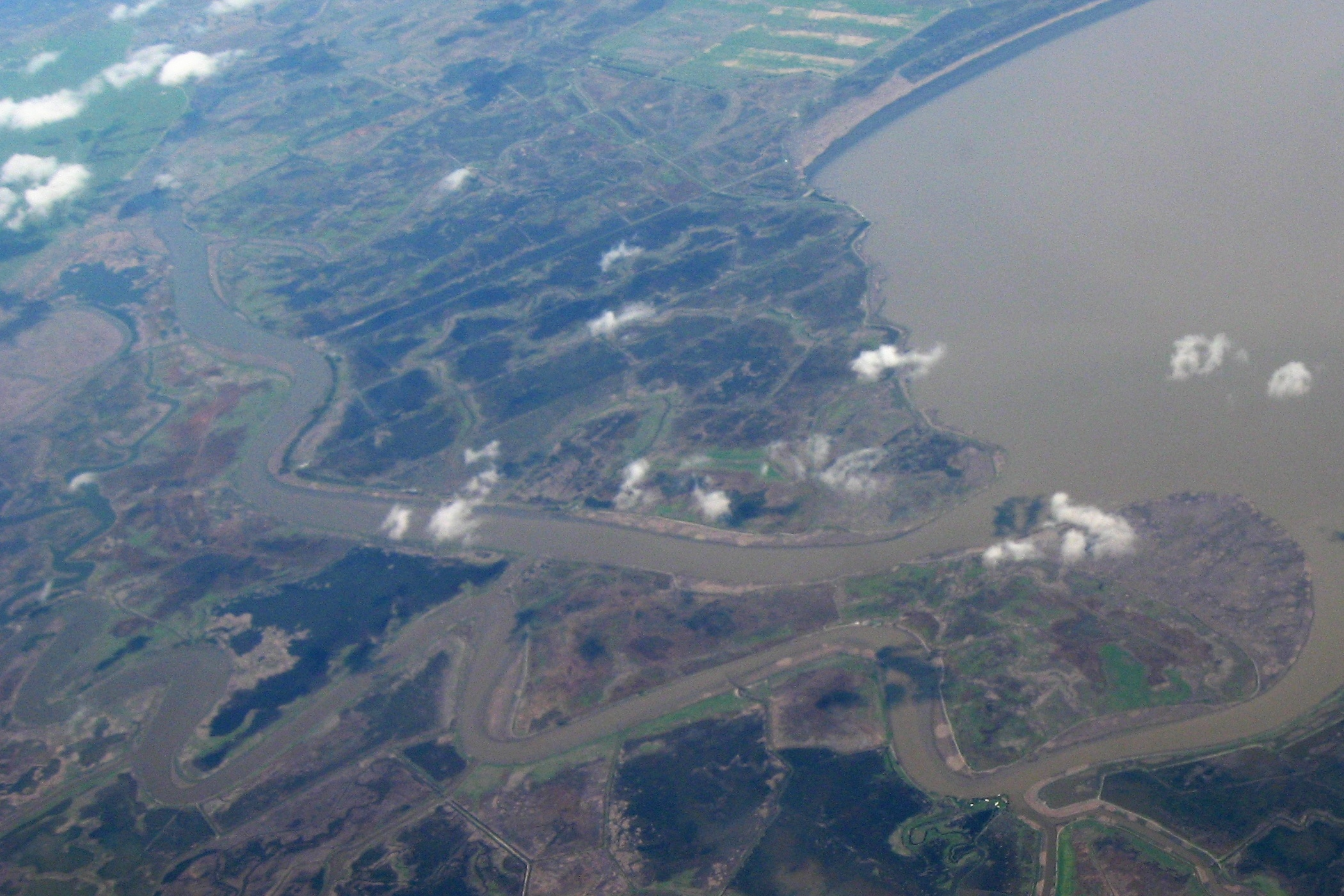
Aerial photo of Joice Island

Joice Island is a small island in Grizzly Bay (part of Suisun Bay) in California. It is part of Suisun Marsh, and has been used for hunting since the late 19th century. After a failed attempt to reclaim the land for asparagus and alfalfa farming in the early 1900s, Joice Island spent several decades as a wildlife refuge before being opened to the public for hunting in 1964. Currently, the upper portion of Joice Island is part of the California Department of Fish and Wildlife's Grizzly Island Wildlife Area; fishing, as well as the hunting of waterfowl and pigs, is permitted there on a limited basis.

== Geography ==
Grizzly Bay, in which Joice Island is located, is part of Suisun Bay, itself a part of San Francisco Bay. It is part of Solano County, and partially administered by Reclamation District 2141. It is bordered on the east by Montezuma Slough, on the south by Morrow Island, on the west by Suisun Slough, and on the north by Cutoff Slough. Its coordinates are 38°09′00″N 122°03′34″W. Joice Island is a tidal wetland, and is part of Suisun Marsh; the northern part of the island is administered as part of the Grizzly Island Wildlife Area. In 2002, Joice Island was described as "a wetland area consisting of thick cattails, tules, some brush and standing water".

== History ==
Prior to European settlement, Joice Island was inhabited by Patwin people, whose name for the broader area - "Suisun" - means "the place of the west wind".

An unlabeled island, in the same approximate location as the southernmost part of Joice Island, is shown on an 1850 survey map of the San Francisco Bay Area made by Cadwalader Ringgold and also on an 1854 map of the area by Henry Lange. It is first seen labeled, along with Deadman Island, Grizzly Island, Simmons Island, Ryer Island and Roe Island, on a 1902 United States Geological Survey (USGS) map of the area.

In the late 19th century, Joice Island was described as "a very valuable property", known for good hunting; in 1895, it was said that "the recent frosts, rain and cold weather have greatly improved the snipe grounds" on Joice Island. In 1903, the island was described as a 2,700-acre (1,100 ha) tract of "rich dairy and stock land", one of the largest stock ranches in central California, which had been purchased and leveed in by B. F. Rush some years prior.

In 1890, one quarter of the island was owned by a mysterious (and possibly fictitious) man named Bertrand G. Chandos, allegedly the brother of a recently deceased Mrs. Bensley. Of this woman, the San Francisco Examiner said "the answers to letters that were sent abroad some time ago establish beyond any doubt the fact that the stories told to various people here about her birth and early life in England and Scotland were wholly false". Chandos had exchanged letters with Mrs. Bensley in which their relationship was represented inconsistently; "in nearly all of [their letters] he addresses her as 'My dear aunt,' and she writes to her 'Dear nephew.' In a few of his letters he addresses her as 'Dear madam.'" It was alleged by the Examiner that Mrs. Bensley had woven a "web of intrigue" with its "primary object the defrauding of [her husband] John Bensley, and later the cheating of his creditors".

By 1903, the island was owned by ex-sheriff B.F. Rush, who sold it in June to attorney Louis Titus of San Francisco for "somewhere in the neighborhood of" $10 ($358.00 in 2025) per acre. The deal was described by the Sacramento Bee as "the most important real estate transaction that has taken place here for some time". The same month, the Suisun Board of Trade discussed a proposal to construct a road connecting Suisun to Joice Island and nearby Grizzly Island; this road would reduce the distance between Suisun and Joice from 11 mi (18 km) to 5 mi (8.0 km).

By October, Titus was "putting his grounds" in condition for a wildlife preserve, which was expected to be "one of the best preserves in the State". The reserve was restricted to "the private use of himself and friends"; their first shoot was planned for October 18. In November, Titus and two friends shot 63 ducks on a single hunt; several days later, he returned with his wife, and the two of them shot 35. A 1905 hunt at the island's Belvedere Club, with twelve guns, shot 376 ducks. However, in June 1905, the owners of Joice Island decided to use the land for agriculture, forming the Joice Island Asparagus Company. This corporation was capitalized with 1,000 shares of stock sold at $100 each, for a total of $100,000 ($3.58 million in 2025). The island was planned to be reclaimed and devoted to growing asparagus and alfalfa. By October, levees were being constructed by W.J. Hotchkiss and John H. Spring. However, the venture was not successful; by 1908, the company's charter was forfeited. By 1927, the island was home to the Mira Monte Gun Club, who in that year began construction of a new clubhouse for $20,000 ($370,690 in 2025); the island was at that point well known for its large population of mallards, spoonbills and sprig.

In 1932, the entire island was purchased from its then-current owner, former San Francisco police commissioner Andrew Mahonet, by the State of California for $72,000 ($1.7 million in 2025) to serve as a wildlife refuge. In 1934, there was an "unusual flight of teal"; by 1942, the refuge had become "a resting and feeding ground for thousands and thousands of ducks and geese during the shooting season". In 1947, largely due to the volume of ducks on Joice Island, hotel owners in surrounding areas (like Grizzly Island) anticipated a "heavy demand for rooms" during shooting season. In 1942, a project to further develop the refuge was completed; 8 mi (13 km) of levees and four flood gates were installed to "allow better control of the refuge water supply and protect the entire area from inundation during the flood season". The water-control system also helped prevent disease among waterfowl; in 1952, while many waterfowl in the region were struck with botulism, at Joice Island "the water was kept fresh and no sick ducks were seen even at the peak of population". In 1952, the Volanti Duck Club was situated on the island, and in 1958, the refuge was estimated to contain "slightly less than a half million" ducks.

In 1963, a proposal was made to open the island to the general public for hunting. While a group known as the Humane Affiliates opposed the opening of the preserve on the principle that "hunting will soon be passe", the Department of Fish and Game approved the proposal; in 1964, the eastern portion of the island was made available for public shooting. That hunting season, there were estimated to be some 200,000 birds on Joice Island; the next year, hunters on Joice Island "brought down close to three birds per man". In 1966, the Grizzly Island hunting area (including Joice Island as well as Grizzly Island) had a limit of 550 shooters at a time. Despite unfavorable weather conditions in 1967, there were still an estimated 393,000 ducks at Joice Island during the shooting season.

Hunting continued in the following decade; in 1977, hunters at Joice Island took an average of almost three birds per shoot, and in 1980 they took an average of 2.47. In 1982, the island was open to hunters for only two days (which yielded an average of 3.34 birds per hunter).

In 1983, duck populations on Joice Island had decreased to the point where the Department of Fish and Game closed it to hunters. Joice Island was open to fishing in 1989, however, and in 1992 it was the site of a pig hunt.

By the 1990s, duck populations had recovered, and Joice Island was partially reopened for a "special opportunity hunt during the second half of the 1994–95 waterfowl season". A maximum of 35 hunters were allowed to shoot on the island that season. The island was open for hunting the next season as well (with an average of 2.51 ducks per hunter). However, by 1998, the island was once again protected.

More pig hunts would be held at Joice Island in 2001, 2002, 2003, 2006, 2012, and 2017.

Currently, access to Joice Island during hunting season is restricted, and hunters are "required to purchase in advance a Type A hunting pass in order to exchange for an entry permit".
