= Wheeler Island (California) =

Island in California

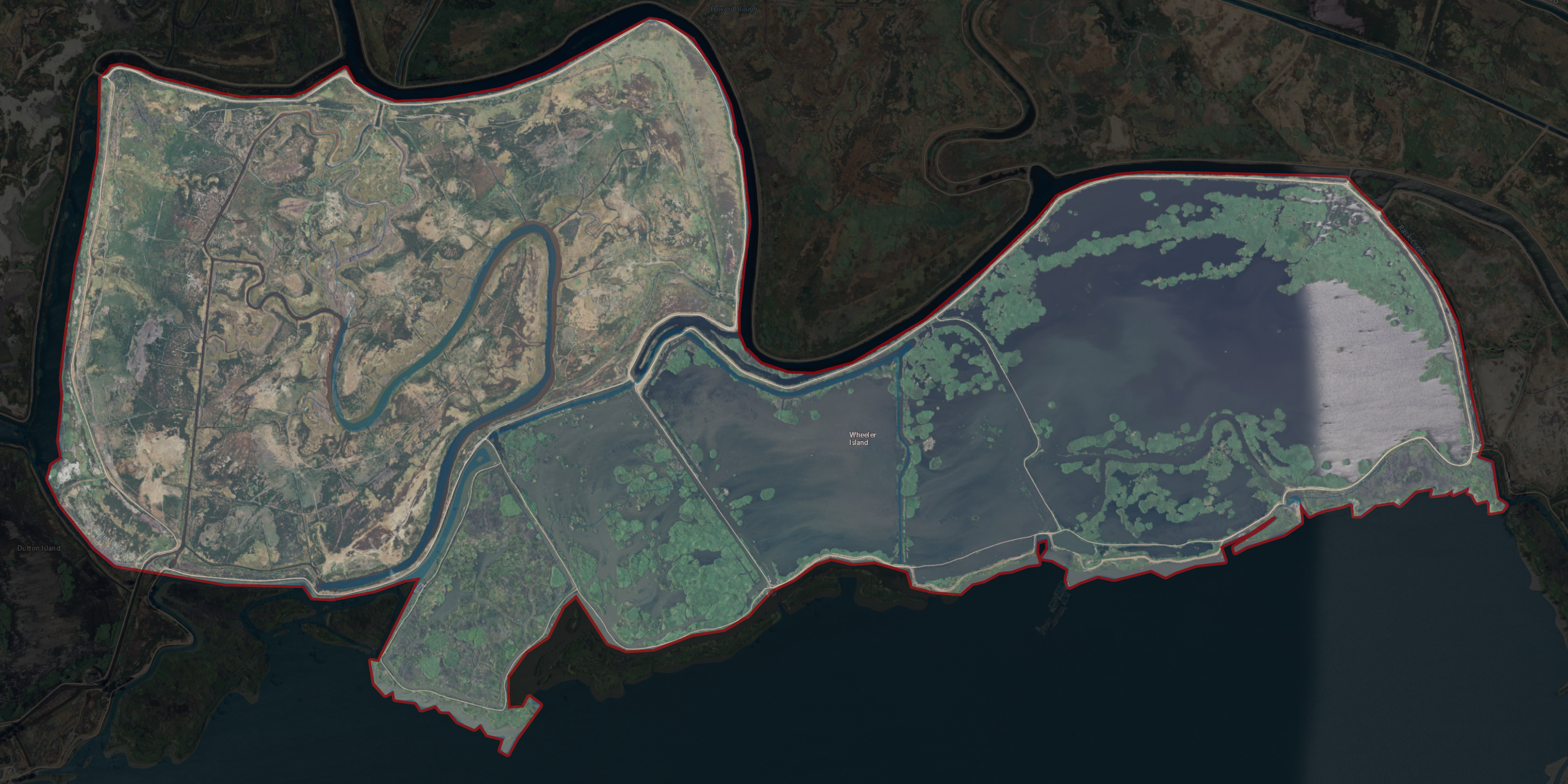
- USGS aerial imagery of Wheeler Island

- Location within Sacramento-San Joaquin River Delta Location within San Francisco Bay Area Location within California Location within the United States

Geography
- Location: Northern California
- Coordinates: 38°05′06″N 121°56′15″W
- Adjacent to: Suisun Bay

Administration
- United States
- State: California
- County: Solano

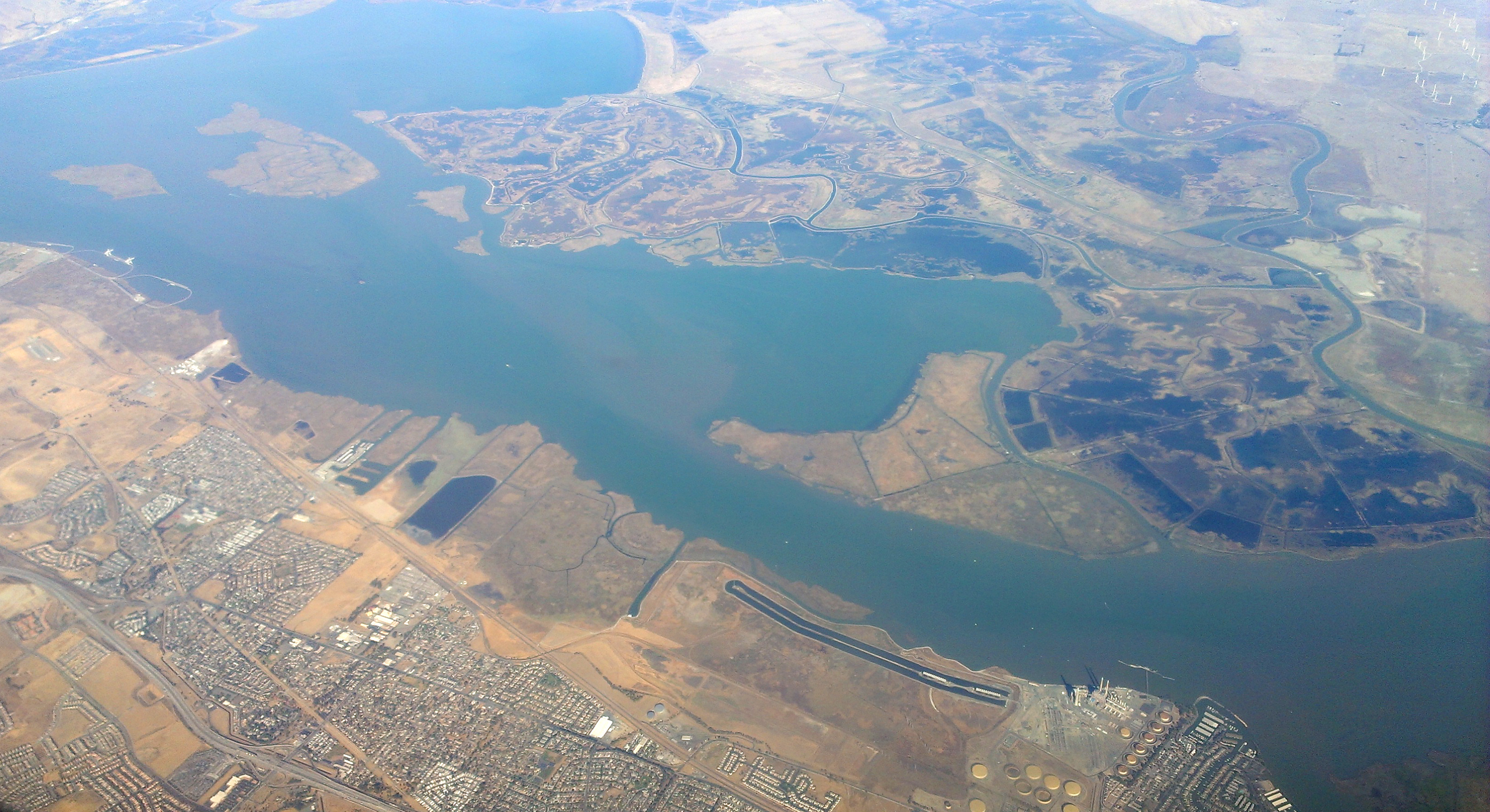
A 2015 aerial photo of Grizzly Bay taken from the southeast. Van Sickle Island is to the east of Wheeler Island, Honker Bay to its south, Dutton Island and Simmons Island to its west, and Hammond Island to its north.

Wheeler Island is a small island in Suisun Bay, California. It is part of Solano County; parts of it are included in Reclamation Districts 2127 (Simmons Wheeler) and 2130 (Honker Bay). Its coordinates are 38°05′06″N 121°56′15″W. An 1850 survey map of the San Francisco Bay area made by Cadwalader Ringgold, and an 1854 map by Henry Lange, show islands partially covering some of the current area of Wheeler Island, labeled "Davis Island" and "Warrington Island".
