= Simmons Island =

Island in California

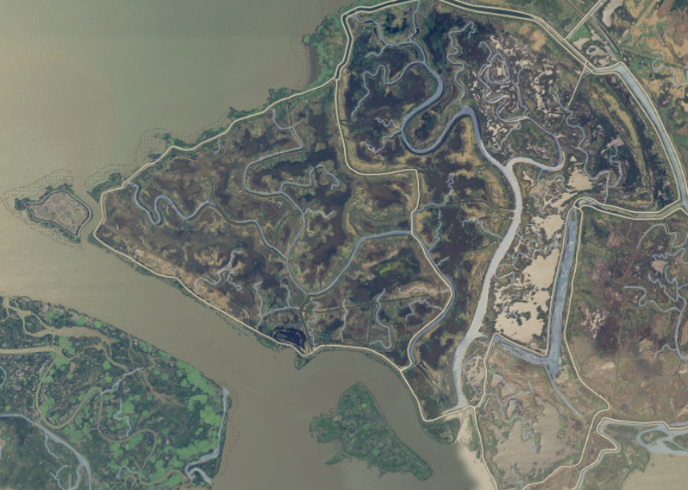
- USGS aerial photo of Simmons Island

- Location within Sacramento-San Joaquin River Delta Location within San Francisco Bay Area Location within California Location within the United States

Geography
- Location: Northern California
- Coordinates: 38°05′49″N 121°59′26″W
- Adjacent to: Suisun Bay

Administration
- United States
- State: California
- County: Solano

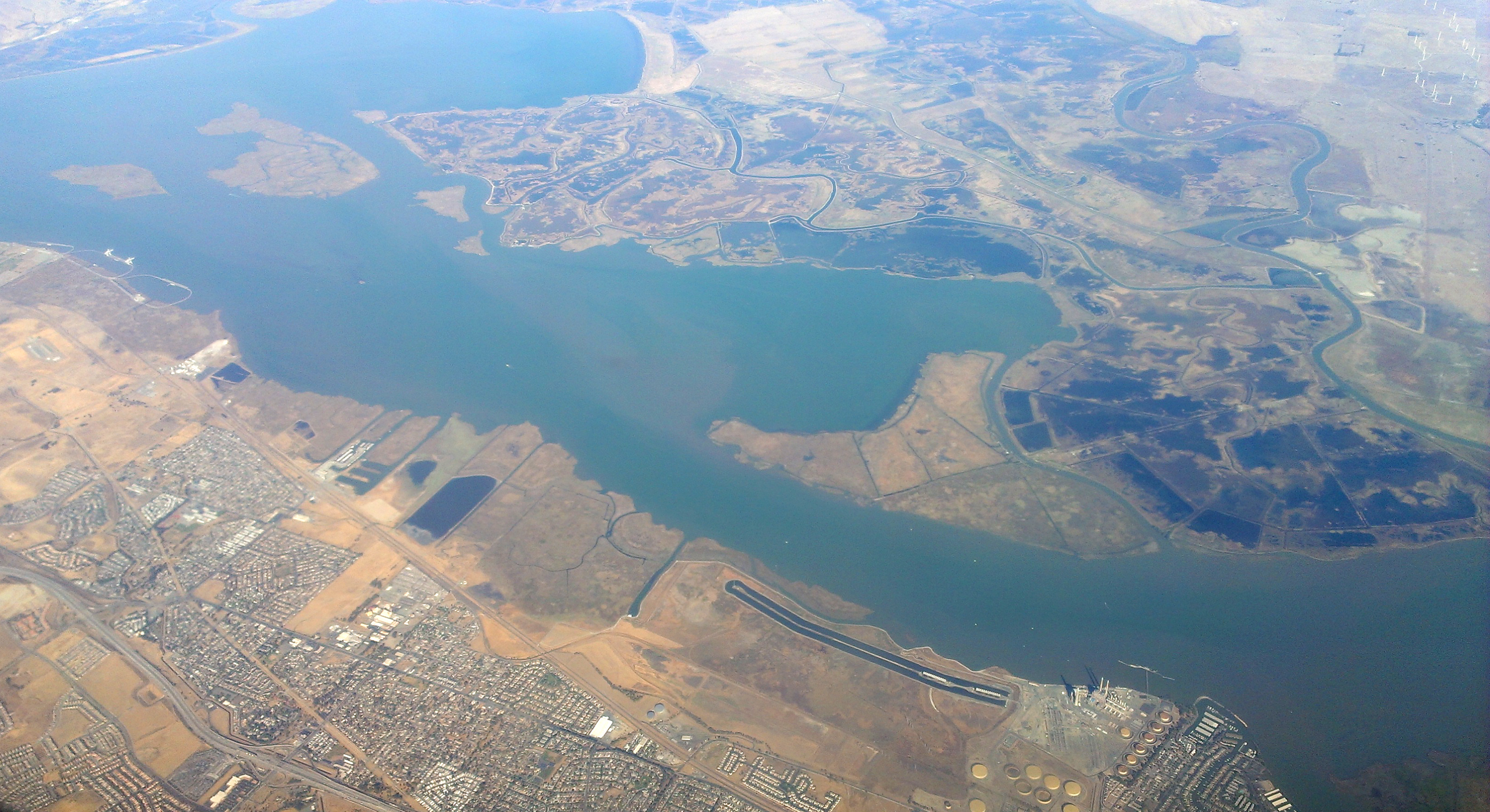
A 2015 aerial photo of Grizzly Bay taken from the southeast; Simmons Island can be seen on the left, with Ryer Island to its southwest, Freeman Island to its south, Dutton Island to its southeast, Wheeler Island and Hammond Island to its east, Grizzly Island to its north, and Grizzly Bay to its northwest and west.

Simmons Island is a small island in Grizzly Bay (part of Suisun Bay) in the San Francisco Bay Area of California. It is part of Solano County, and included within Reclamation District 2127. Its coordinates are 38°05′49″N 121°59′26″W. It is shown as "Simmons Island" on an 1850 survey map of the San Francisco Bay area made by Cadwalader Ringgold, and as "Simons Island" on an 1854 map of the area by Henry Lange. It is labeled, along with Deadman Island, Joice Island, Grizzly Island, Ryer Island and Roe Island, on a 1902 USGS map of the area.
