= Spinner Island =

Island in California

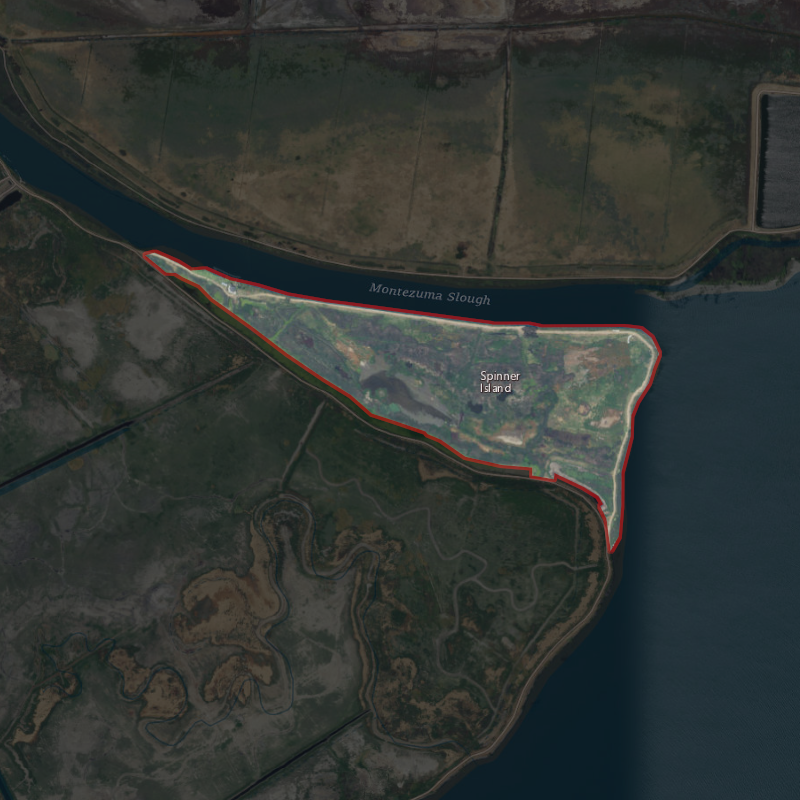
- USGS aerial imagery of Spinner Island. Van Sickle Island can be seen to the southwest.

- Location within Sacramento-San Joaquin River Delta Location within California Location within the United States

Geography
- Location: Northern California
- Coordinates: 38°04′11″N 121°52′10″W
- Adjacent to: Sacramento–San Joaquin River Delta
- Highest elevation: 0 ft (0 m)

Administration
- United States
- State: California
- County: Solano

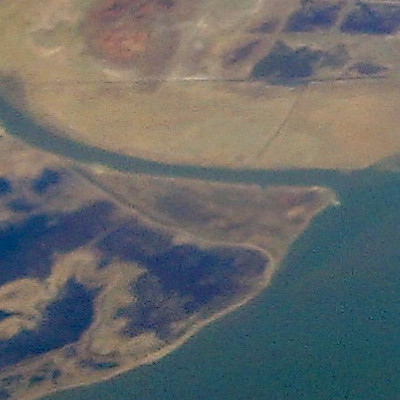
Spinner Island viewed from the south, in an aerial photo taken in 2015

Spinner Island is an island in Suisun Bay, an embayment of San Francisco Bay, downstream of the Sacramento–San Joaquin River Delta. It is part of Solano County, California, and not managed by any reclamation district. Its coordinates are 38°04′11″N 121°52′10″W, and the United States Geological Survey measured its elevation as 0 ft (0 m) in 1981. It is shown (but not labeled) in an 1850 survey map of the San Francisco Bay area made by Cadwalader Ringgold, as well as an 1854 map of the area by Henry Lange.
