= Chipps Island =

Island in California

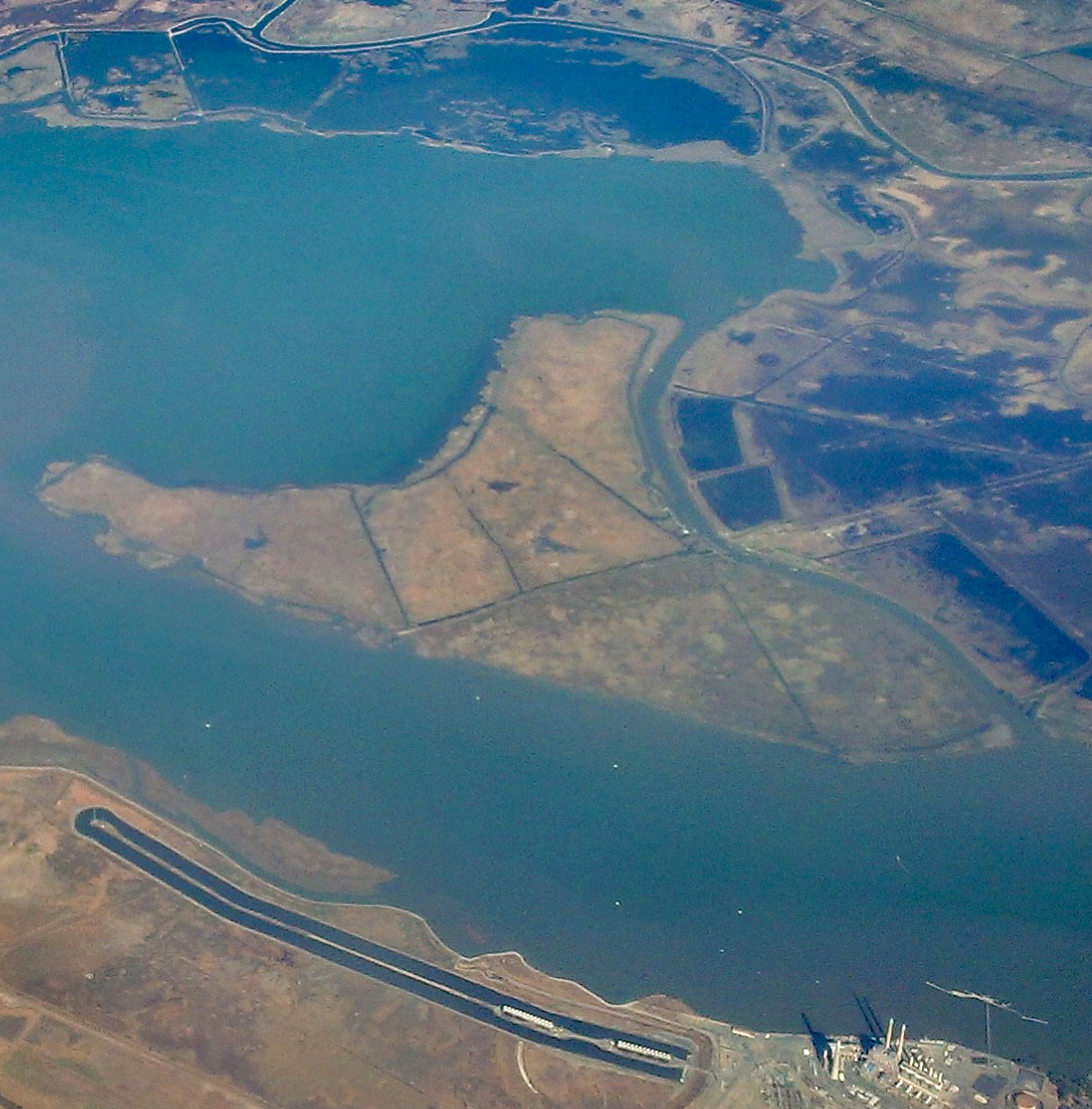
- Chipps Island from the south, in an aerial photo from 2015

- Location within Sacramento-San Joaquin River Delta Location within San Francisco Bay Area Location within California Location within the United States

Geography
- Location: Northern California
- Coordinates: 38°03′19″N 121°54′43″W
- Adjacent to: Suisun Bay

Administration
- United States
- State: California
- County: Solano

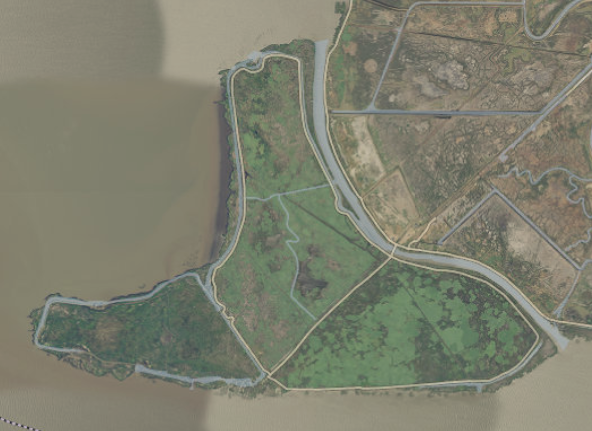
United States Geological Survey aerial photo of Chipps Island.

Chipps Island is a small island in Suisun Bay, California. It is part of Solano County. It is also known as Knox Island, Its coordinates are 38°03′19″N 121°54′43″W by which name it appears on an 1850 survey map of the San Francisco Bay area made by Cadwalader Ringgold, as well as an 1854 map of the area by Henry Lange. In 1959, the state of California used Chipps Island in a legal definition of the western boundary of the Sacramento–San Joaquin River Delta.

In 1960s, during efforts to devise large-scale hydrological engineering projects in San Francisco Bay and adjacent estuaries, Chipps Island was proposed as the site of a dam across the Carquinez Strait as a "more feasible" alternative to the very expensive Reber Plan. The Chipps Island dam was estimated to cost $194,400,000 in 1963 ($2.04 billion in 2025), and retain 1,380,000 acre⋅ft (1.70×10^{9} m^{3}) of fresh water (which would otherwise be emptied into the Pacific Ocean). However, the project faced barriers to implementation, including potential hazards to wildlife (as it was expected to cause the flow of the San Joaquin River to reverse during part of salmon's migration period, preventing them from swimming upstream). The Sacramento Bee quoted "state fish and wildlife experts" as saying that the "seriousness of this apparently insolvable problem" was significant enough to "postpone further investigation of the other effects of the Chipps Island plan". By 1964, new plans from the Inter-Agency Delta Committee had "discarded" the Chipps Island water barrier in plans for managing freshwater in the region.

Chipps Island is located close to hydrocarbon deposits, and in 1967, bids were opened for oil and gas rights on parcels in the vicinity of the island.

While a duck club had once operated on Chipps Island, it was in disuse by the mid-1970s; in 1974, police arrested a "bustling" ring of illicit amphetamine producers using the abandoned structures to store large amounts of the stimulant.

In the 2010s, Chipps Island was part of a large purchase of Delta land attempted by the Metropolitan Water District of Southern California (along with nearby Bouldin and Bacon Islands, as well as much of the Holland and Webb Tracts). The district was subsequently sued by several northern California environmental groups, water agencies, and the counties of Contra Costa and San Joaquin.

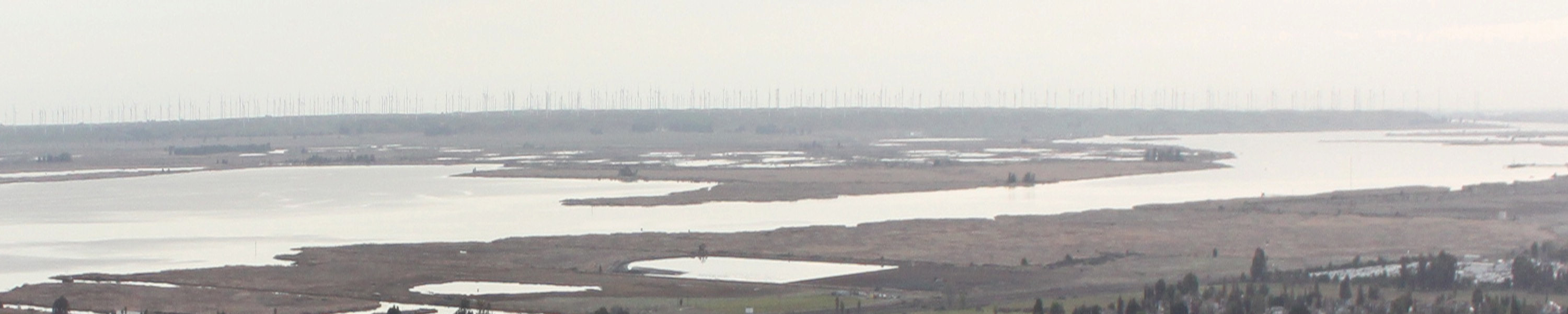
A photo of Chipps Island taken in March 2021 from Bay Point. Van Sickle Island can be seen to the north.
