= Hammond Island (California) =

Island in California

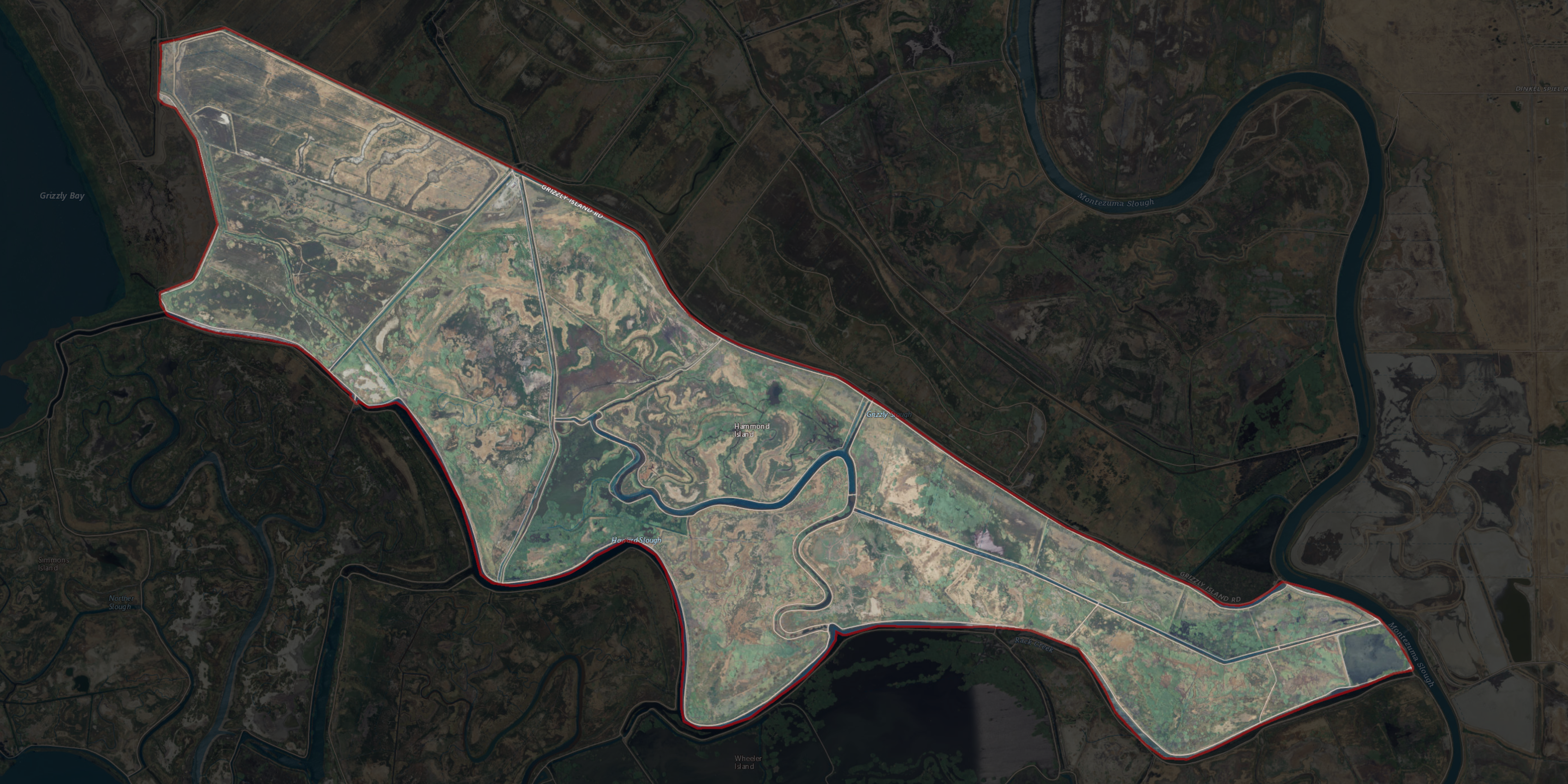
- USGS aerial imagery of Hammond Island, with Grizzly Bay to the west, Grizzly Island to the north across Grizzly Slough, Wheeler Island to the south across Roaring River Slough, Van Sickle Island to the southeast, and Simmons Island to the southwest.

- Location within Sacramento-San Joaquin River Delta Location within San Francisco Bay Area Location within California Location within the United States

Geography
- Location: Northern California
- Coordinates: 38°06′18″N 121°56′15″W
- Adjacent to: Suisun Bay
- Highest elevation: 0 ft (0 m)

Administration
- United States
- State: California
- County: Solano

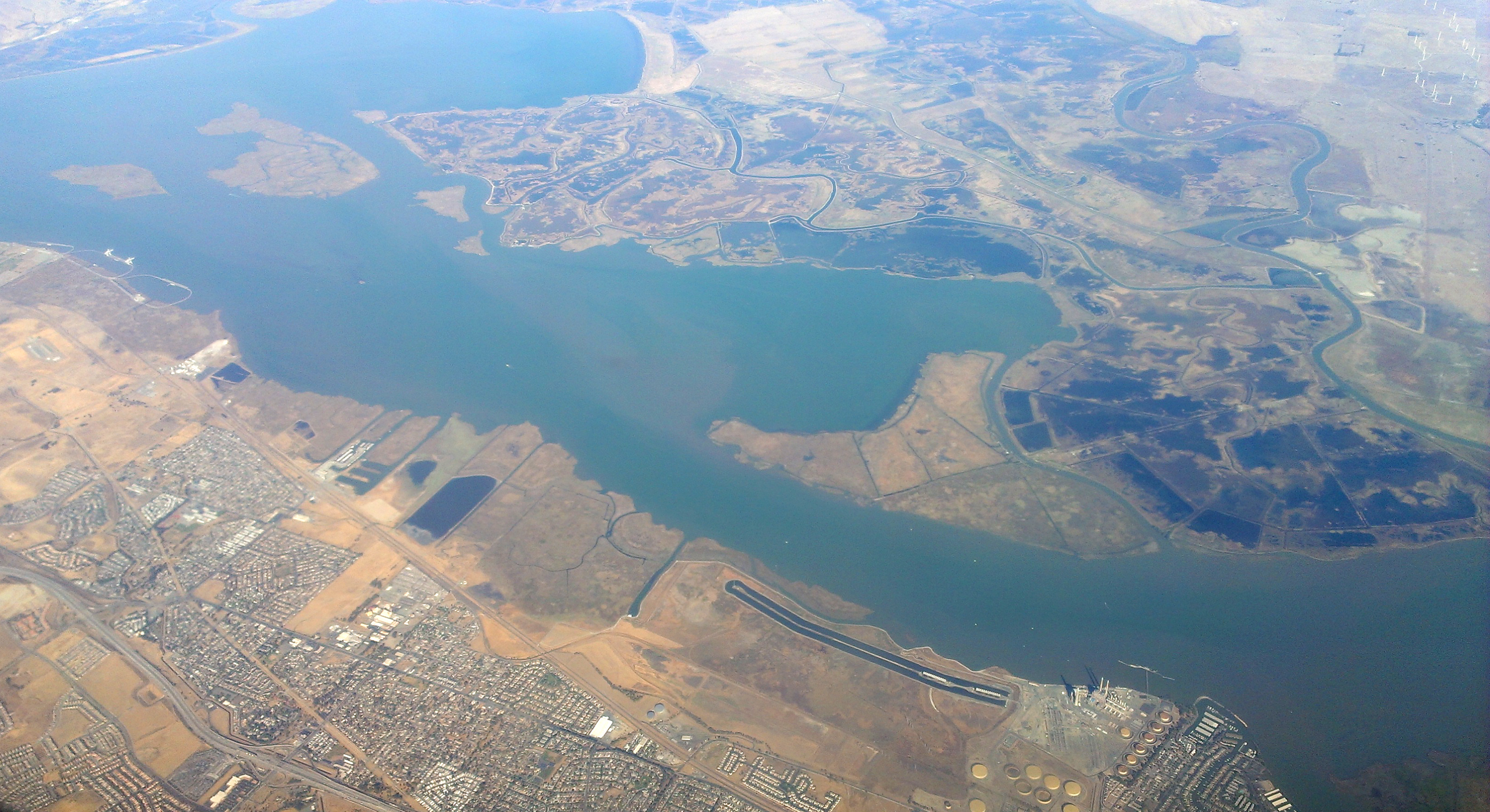
A 2015 aerial photo of Grizzly Bay taken from the southeast; Hammond Island can be seen near the center, with Van Sickle Island to the southeast, Wheeler Island and Honker Bay to the south, Simmons Island to the southwest and Grizzly Island to the north.

Hammond Island is a small island in Suisun Bay, California. It is part of Solano County. Its coordinates are 38°06′18″N 121°56′15″W. An 1850 survey map of the San Francisco Bay area made by Cadwalader Ringgold shows islands partially covering some of the current area of Hammond Island, labeled "Davis Island" and "Warrington Island".
