= Freeman Island (California) =

Island in California

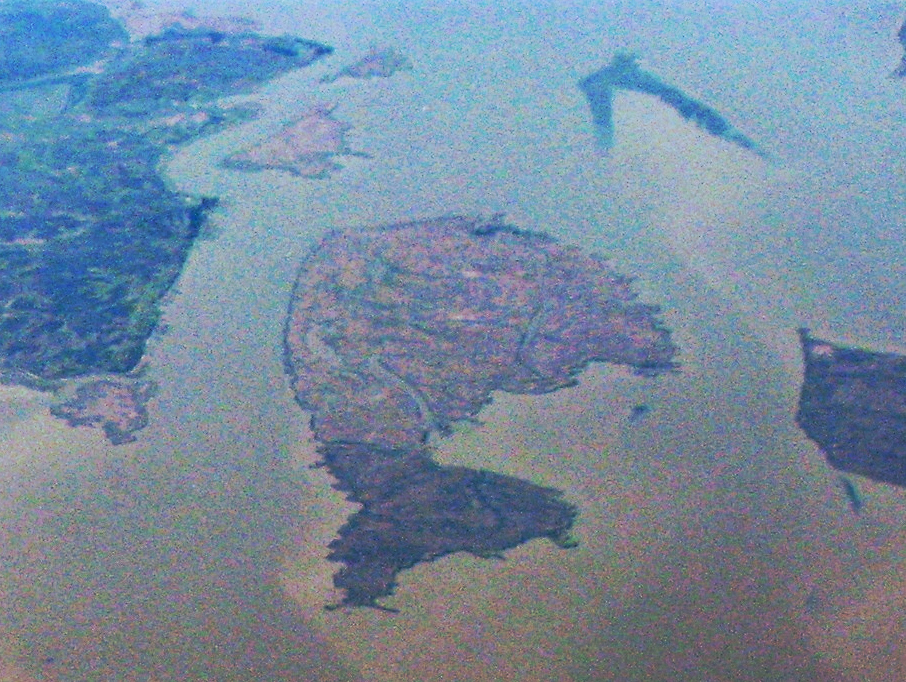
- Ryer Island is the large, dolphin-shaped island in the center of this aerial photo. Directly above it and to the left is Freeman Island; above Freeman Island is Snag Island. On the right, partially out of the frame of the image, is Roe Island.

- Location within Sacramento-San Joaquin River Delta Location within San Francisco Bay Area Location within California Location within the United States

Geography
- Location: Northern California
- Coordinates: 38°04′46″N 121°59′09″W
- Adjacent to: Suisun Bay

Administration
- United States
- State: California
- County: Solano

Freeman Island is a small island in Suisun Bay, California. It is part of Solano County. It is also known as Holbrook Island. Its coordinates are 38°04′46″N 121°59′09″W. Freeman Island is a popular spot for fishing; in 2019, a 53-inch sturgeon was caught near the island.
