= Ryer Island (Suisun Bay) =

Island in California

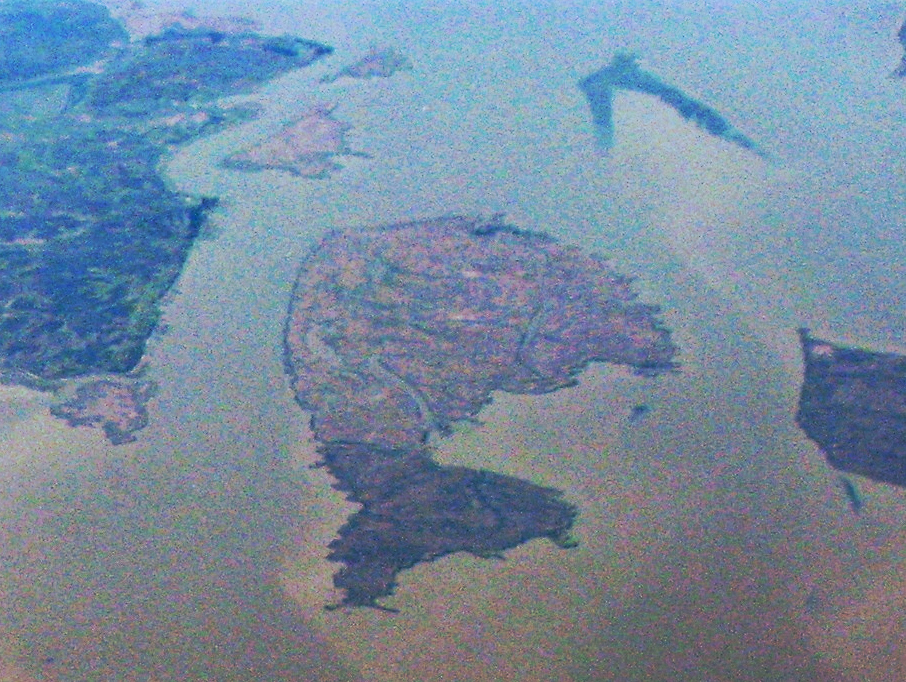
- Ryer Island is the large, dolphin-shaped island in the center of this aerial photo. Directly above it and to the left is Freeman Island, and above Freeman Island is Snag Island. To its right is Roe Island.

- Location within Sacramento-San Joaquin River Delta Location within San Francisco Bay Area Location within California Location within the United States

Geography
- Location: Northern California
- Coordinates: 38°04′58″N 122°0′52″W
- Adjacent to: Suisun Bay

Administration
- United States
- State: California
- County: Solano

Ryer Island is an island in Suisun Bay at the mouth of the Sacramento-San Joaquin River Delta in Solano County, California, eight miles east-northeast of Benicia. It is administered by Reclamation District 501, and is in the Suisun Resource Conservation District. At the time of statehood it was known as Kings Island, and is labeled as such on an 1850 survey map of the San Francisco Bay area made by Cadwalader Ringgold as well as an 1854 map of the area by Henry Lange. It is labeled, along with Deadman Island, Joice Island, Grizzly Island, Simmons Island, and Roe Island, on a 1902 USGS map of the area.

== See also ==
- List of islands of California
- USS Ryer
