= Hammond Island =

Hammond Island may refer to:

- Hammond Island, Queensland
- Hammond Island, California
