= Grizzly Island =

Island in California

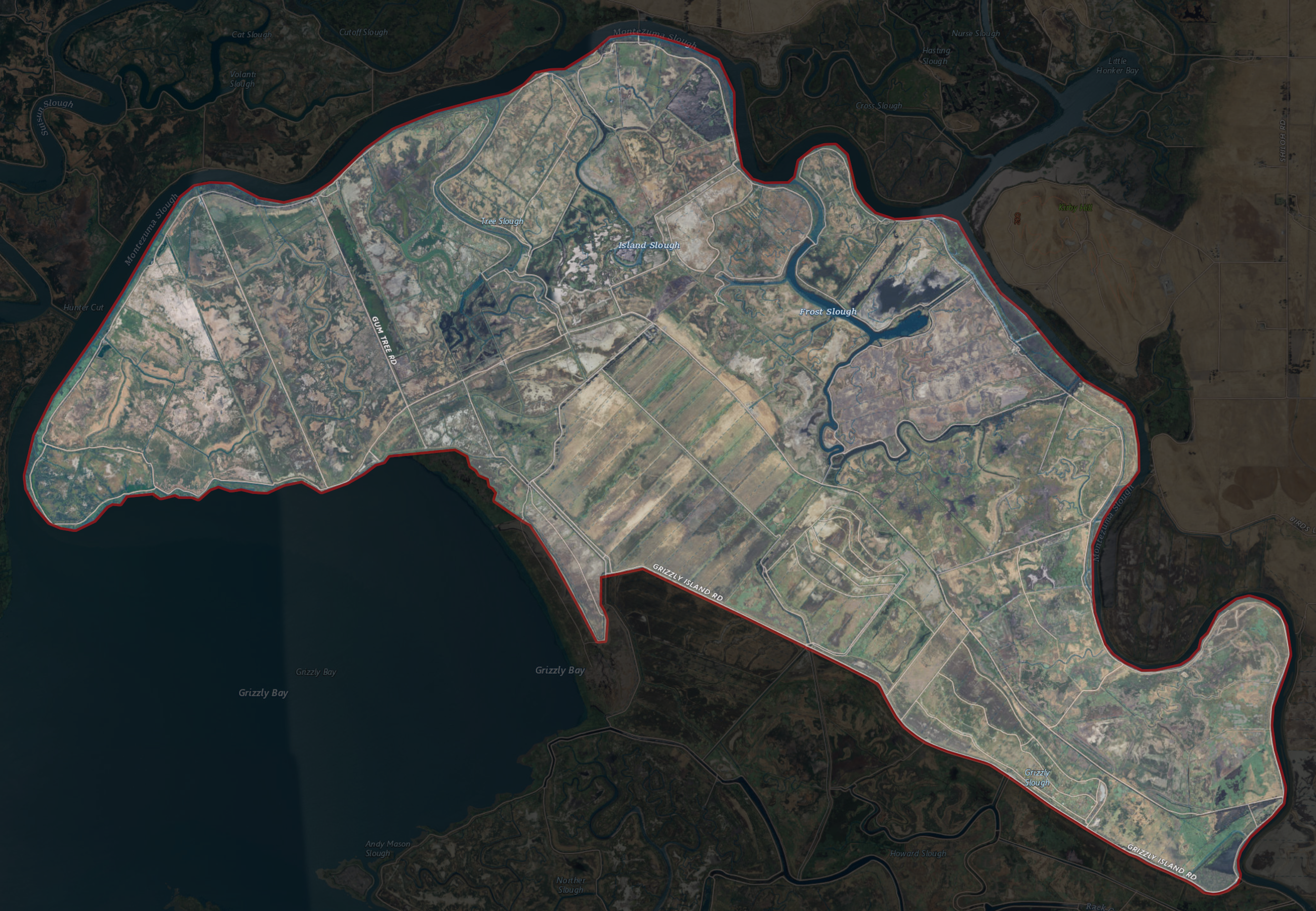
- USGS aerial imagery of Grizzly Island.

- Location within Sacramento-San Joaquin River Delta Location within San Francisco Bay Area Location within California Location within the United States

Geography
- Location: Northern California
- Coordinates: 38°09′05″N 121°58′22″W
- Adjacent to: Suisun Bay

Administration
- United States
- State: California
- County: Solano

Grizzly Island is a small island in Grizzly Bay (part of Suisun Bay) in the San Francisco Bay Area of California. It is part of Solano County, partially managed by Reclamation Districts 2112 (Schafer Pintail), 2129 (Frost Lake) and 2136 (Grizzly West). Its coordinates are 38°09′05″N 121°58′22″W. Islands that partially cover some of its current area, labelled "Warrington Island" and "Davis Island", are shown on an 1850 survey map of the San Francisco Bay area made by Cadwalader Ringgold and an 1854 map of the area by Henry Lange. It is labeled, along with Deadman Island, Joice Island, Simmons Island, Ryer Island and Roe Island, on a 1902 USGS map of the area.

== Land use and management ==
=== Hunting ===
Grizzly Island has been used as a recreational hunting ground since at least the twentieth century. Before the state's acquisition of the wildlife area, private duck clubs operated alongside agricultural properties throughout the Suisun Marsh. The California Department of Fish and Wildlife acquired the Joice Island property in 1931 and purchased the 8,600-acre Grizzly Island Unit in 1950. Hunting and wildlife observation continued as recreational uses of the area following its acquisition by the state.

=== Wildfires ===
In October 2019, a wildfire burned through portions of Grizzly Island Wildlife Area. Initially reported as a 1,000-acre vegetation fire, the blaze was subsequently described by California Department of Fish and Wildlife personnel as having burned approximately 2,000 acres of upland fields and a closed zone of the wildlife area.

The fire damaged vegetation and infrastructure on Joice Island, including infrastructure associated with Pond 12. Subsequent restoration efforts included improvements to water-control infrastructure and vegetation management. In 2021, the California Waterfowl Association reported that repairs to pumps and pipes damaged in the 2019 fire were part of a broader effort to restore the pond's water-management system.
