= Roe Island =

Island in Suisun Bay in Solano County, California

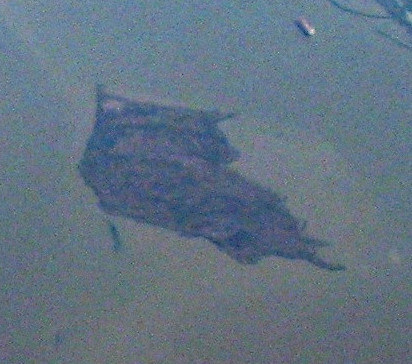
- Roe Island in an aerial photo from 2009.

- Location within Sacramento-San Joaquin River Delta Location within San Francisco Bay Area Location within California Location within the United States

Geography
- Location: Northern California
- Coordinates: 38°04′21″N 122°02′05″W
- Adjacent to: Suisun Bay

Administration
- United States
- State: California
- County: Solano

Roe Island is an island in Suisun Bay at the mouth of the Sacramento-San Joaquin River Delta in Solano County, California, 10 km east of Benicia. Its western tip is named Preston Point, and its eastern tip is Gillespie Point. It is shown, labeled "Preston Island", on an 1850 survey map of the San Francisco Bay area made by Cadwalader Ringgold and an 1854 map of the area by Henry Lange. It is labeled, along with Deadman Island, Joice Island, Grizzly Island, Simmons Island and Ryer Island, on a 1902 USGS map of the area.

On November 22, 2010, Brian Hopper was rescued from Roe Island by the U.S. Coast Guard. He had been stranded on the island for five days (after his rubber raft sprung a leak), before using his cell phone to contact a cousin, who notified the Coast Guard.

== See also ==
- Roe Island Light a lighthouse on the island
- List of islands of California
