= Roe Island Light =

Lighthouse in California, United States

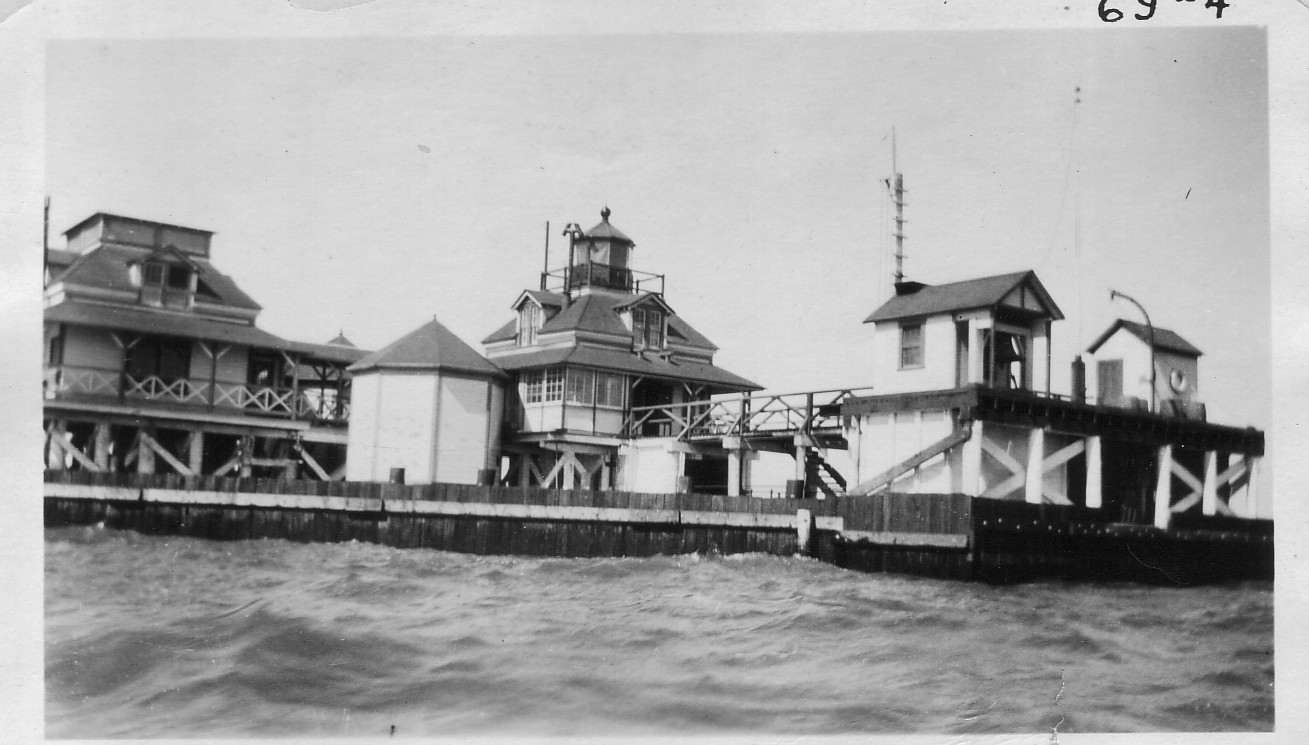
- Roe Island Light by U.S. Coast Guard Archive
- Location: Roe Island; Suisun Bay; California; United States
- Coordinates: 38.067856°N 122.028166°W

Tower
- Constructed: 1891
- Foundation: wooden piles pier
- Construction: wooden building
- Shape: lantern atop a building
- Markings: white building, black lantern
- Fog signal: 1 bell stroke every 10s.

Light
- Deactivated: 1945
- Focal height: 41 ft (12 m)
- Characteristic: Fl W 5.

Roe Island Lighthouse was a lighthouse on Roe Island on the east end of Suisun Bay, California.

== History ==
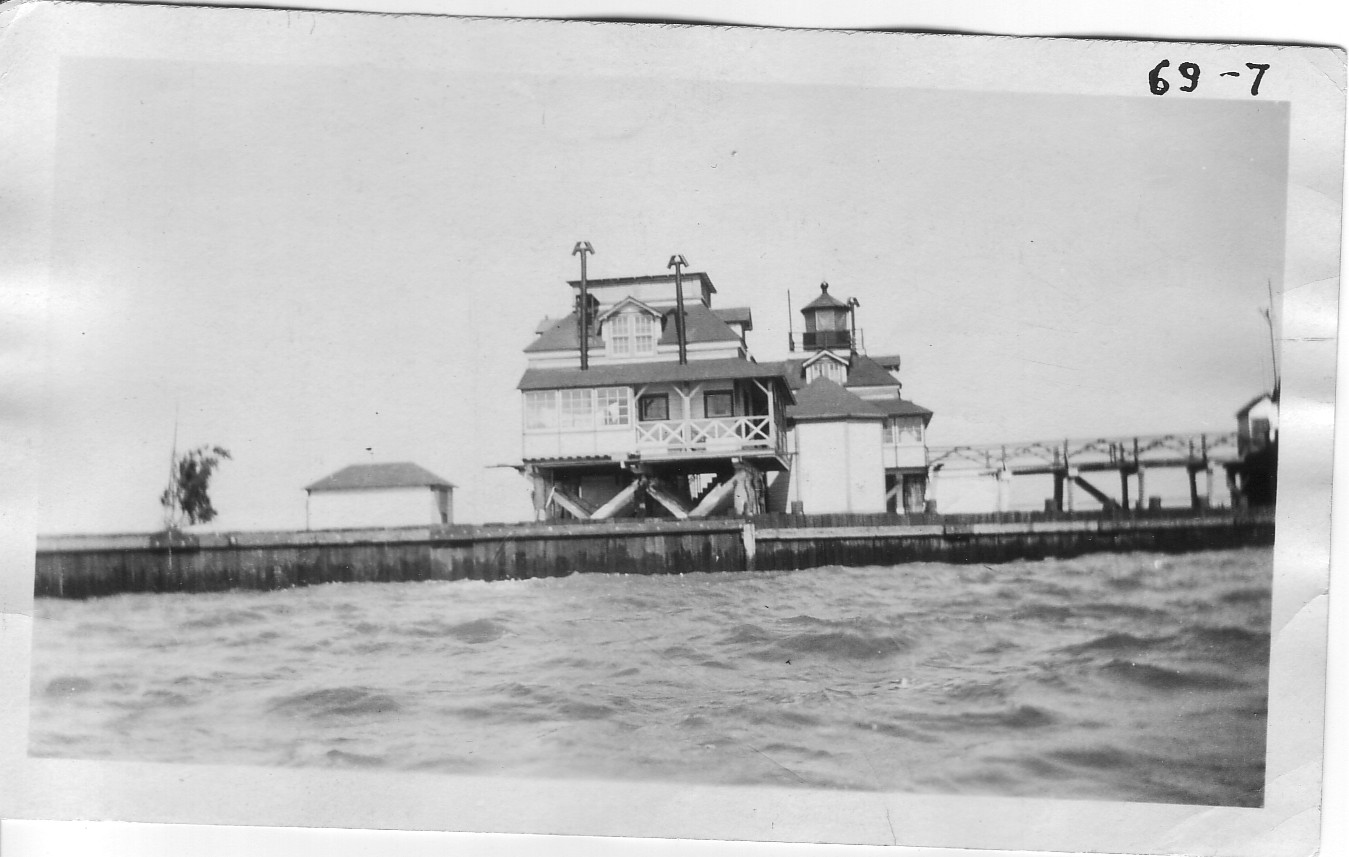
USCG photo, August 7, 1924

The Roe Island Light was built on Roe Island, in the Suisun Bay across from Port Chicago, 33 miles (53 km) inland from the Golden Gate and five miles (8 km) east of Benicia. Congress approved the construction of the lighthouse in 1888, giving the project 10,000 dollars. Beginning on February 16, 1890, a fixed white light was installed, and ran from that day forward. The lighthouse was featured in the San Francisco Call on April 19, 1896, where the author states that the lighthouse's platform was built fifteen feet above high tide, with the lighthouse being the center of the structure, with two rooms also contained in the structure. The lenses of the lighthouse were manufactured in Paris, France by Sautter & Co. In the 1900s, a second dwelling similar to the lighthouse without the lantern was built adjacent to the lighthouse.

During World War II, trains delivered ammunition to ships at the Port Chicago Navy Depot, which was 3,000 yards (2,700 m) from the Roe Island Lighthouse. On 17 July 1944, the Port Chicago disaster occurred, damaging the lighthouse. Two ships, Quinault Victory and E. A. Bryan, were being loaded with tons of munitions. At approximately 10:20 pm, there was an enormous explosion. More than 300 men, both ships, two Coast Guard vessels and much of the train were destroyed.

With changes in shipping behavior occurring in the surrounding area, it was determined that there was no longer a need for the light, and it was decommissioned and sold to a private family in 1945. An 11 August 1944 Coast Guard report noted that the station: "consists of the light, with two keepers, with dwellings, outhouses, power house, water supply tanks, wharf, walkways, boat harbor and boat ways. No fog signal is maintained. Electric current for the light and quarters is generated at the station. Water supply is from rain collected from the building roofs, augmented by supply pumped in from the tenders."

It was sold to a private family. The family used the station as a summer home until fire destroyed it.

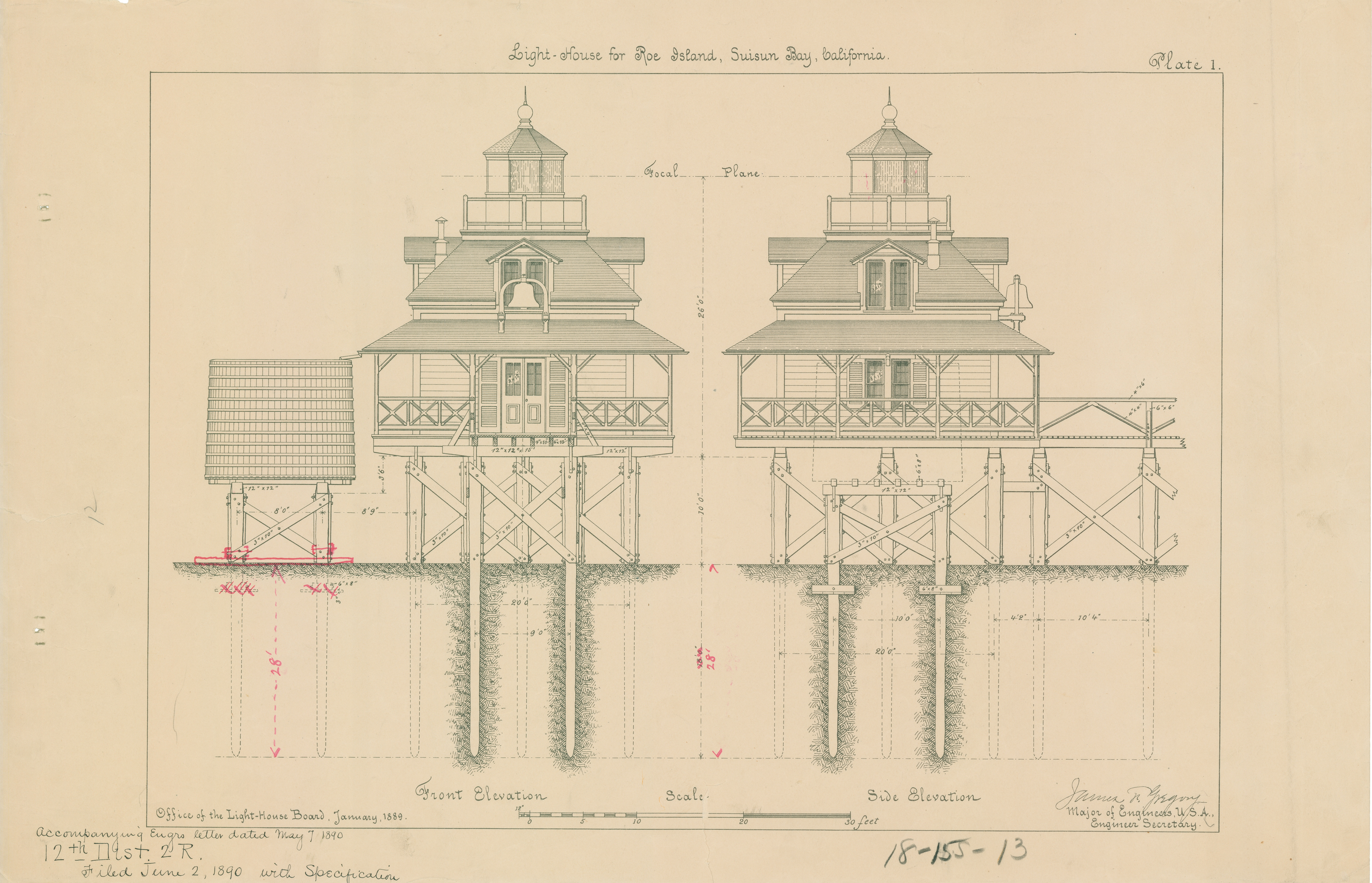
Elevations - NARA - 77416168

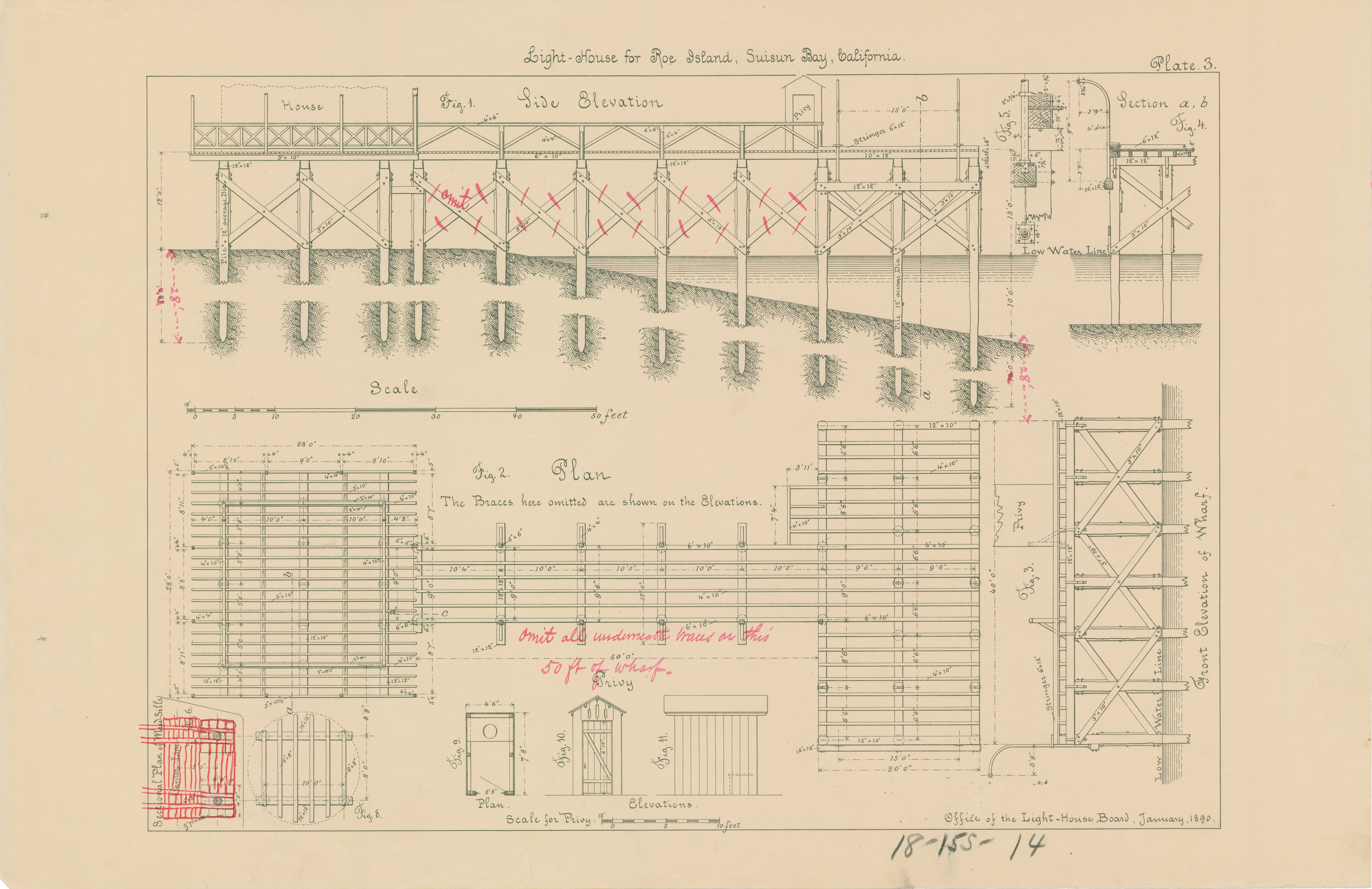
Wharf Bracing - NARA - 77416170

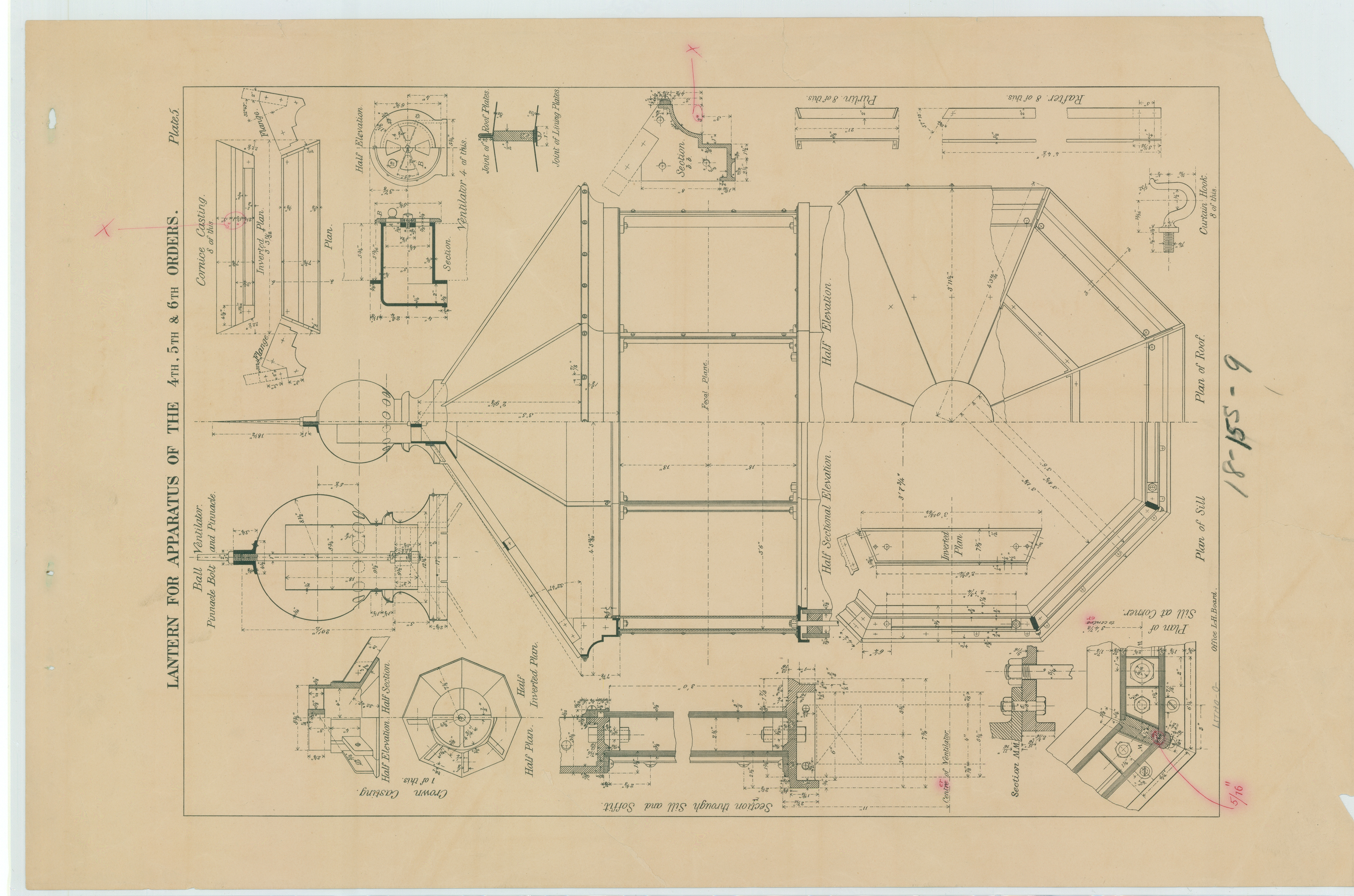
Details of Lantern - Roof - Pinnacle - NARA - 77416176

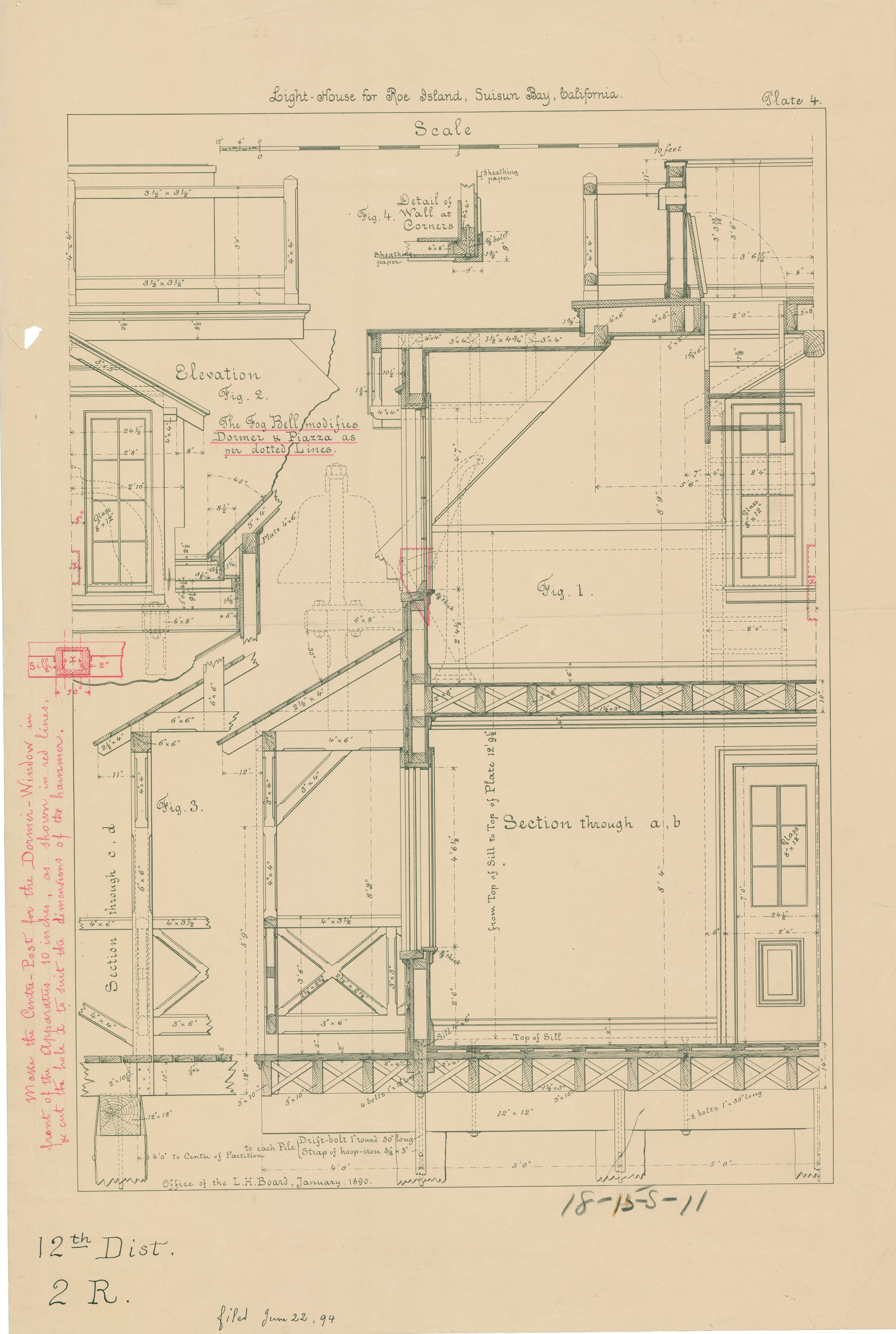
Section - Wall - Window Details (Annotated) - NARA - 77416174

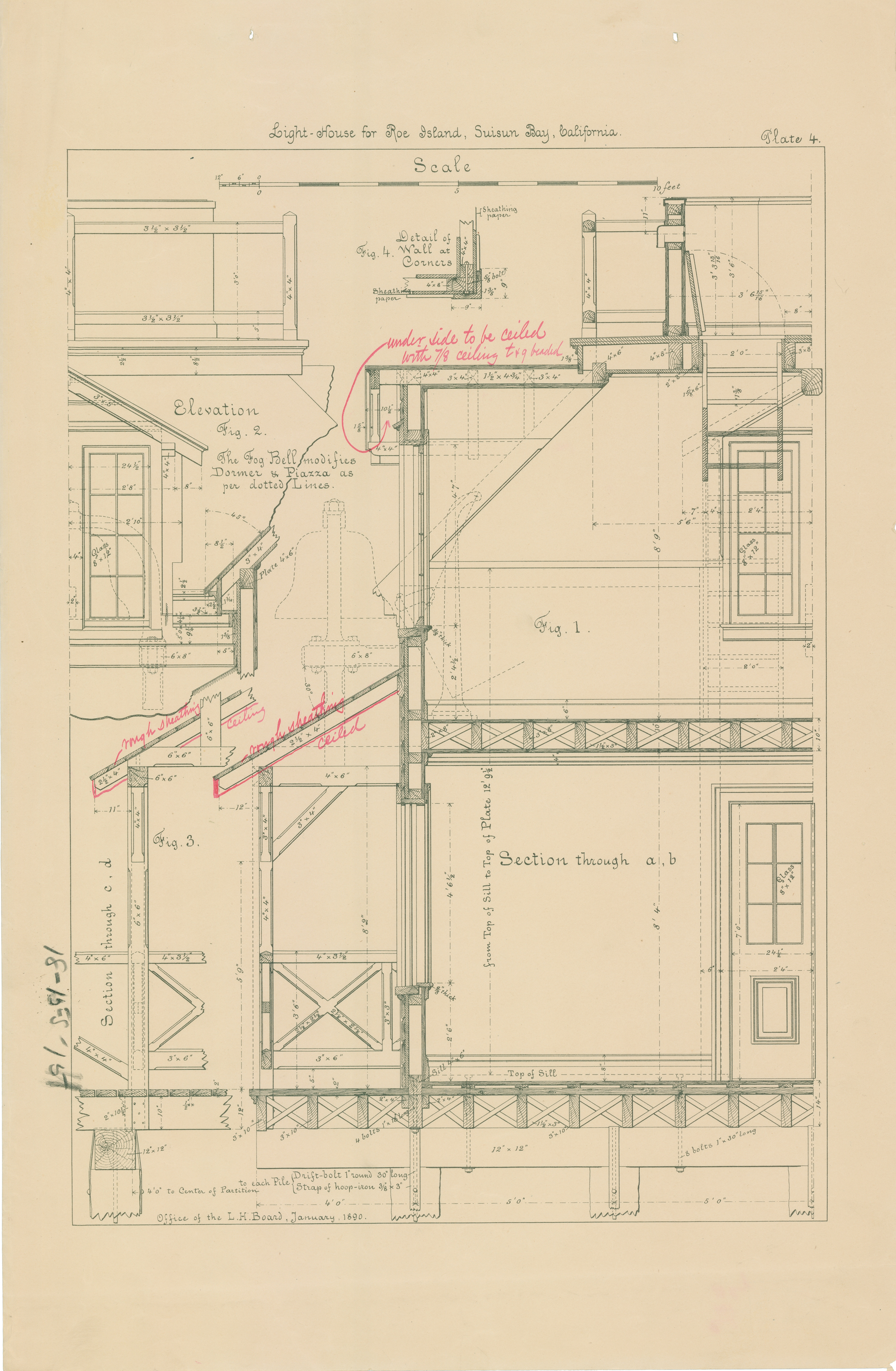
Section - Wall - Window - Door Details - NARA - 77416172

== See also ==
- List of lighthouses in the United States
