= Cordelia Slough =

Tidal watercourse in California, US

Coordinates: 38.135751°N 122.082744°W

Cordelia Slough is a 10.8-mile-long (17.4 km) tidal watercourse which discharges to the Suisun Slough, which in turn empties into Grizzly Bay in Solano County, California. The Suisun Slough, fed by the Green Valley Creek and Red Top Creek, provides a productive habitat for a diversity of aquatic flora and fauna. In particular steelhead migrate up Cordelia Slough to spawn in its two tributaries.

== Endangered species ==
Cordelia Bay is known for its species biodiversity and also for prevalence of endangered species such as Sacramento splittail (Pogonichthys macrolepidotus) and the Salt Marsh Harvest Mouse.

== Water quality ==
Some areas which drain into Cordelia Slough from the north are subject to development pressure from the expanding population of the San Francisco Bay Area; correspondingly, there are increasing risks of adverse water quality due to urban surface runoff from such new development. Cordelia Slough is considered a subarea of the Grizzly Island Wildlife Area, which is a State of California designated Wildlife Area.

== See also ==
- San Francisco Bay Area watercourses
- Suisun Shrew
