= Morrow Island =

Island in California

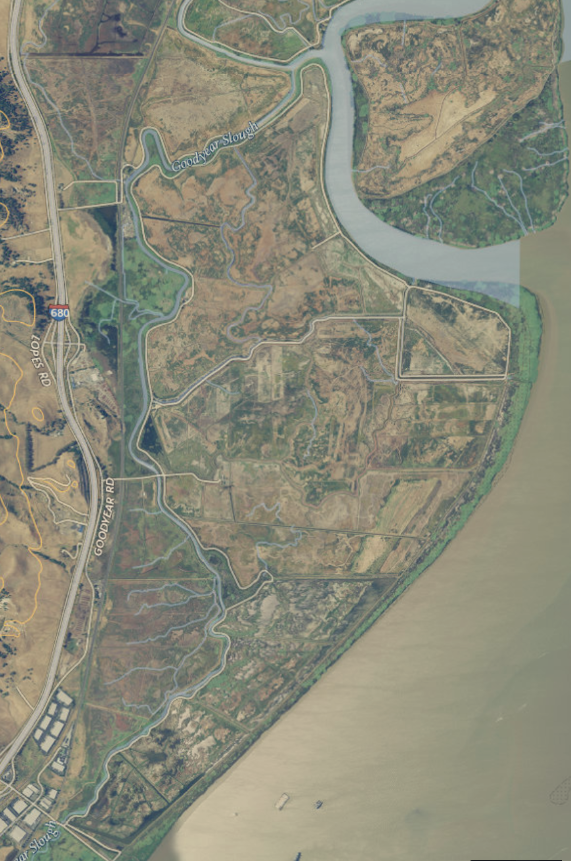
- USGS aerial imagery of the island.

- Location within Sacramento-San Joaquin River Delta Location within San Francisco Bay Area Location within California Location within the United States

Geography
- Location: Northern California
- Coordinates: 38°07′00″N 122°05′11″W
- Adjacent to: Suisun Bay

Administration
- United States
- State: California
- County: Solano

Morrow Island is a small island located off the shore of Grizzly Bay (part of Suisun Bay) in the San Francisco Bay Area of California. It is part of Solano County, California, and partially administered by Reclamation District 2138. Its coordinates are 38°07′00″N 122°05′11″W. It has an elevation of 2 meters to 7 feet.
