= Grizzly Bay =

Baylet of San Francisco Bay in Solano County, California

- Location within San Francisco Bay Area Location within California Location within the United States
- Coordinates: 38°07′N 122°02′W
- Type: Bay
- River sources: Suisun Slough, Cordelia Slough, Sacramento River and San Joaquin River
- Ocean/sea sources: Pacific Ocean
- Basin countries: United States

Grizzly Bay is a baylet of the San Francisco Bay, and an extension of Suisun Bay, which dips into Solano County, California. Grizzly Bay contains many sloughs, wildlife areas, and islands such as Grizzly Island, Joice Island and Morrow Island. It is also home to the Fifth Reserve Fleet, which is docked off the coast of Benicia.

Suisun Slough and Cordelia Slough empty into Grizzly Bay.

== See also ==
- Hydrography of the San Francisco Bay Area
