= Henry Lange =

German cartographer (1821–1893)

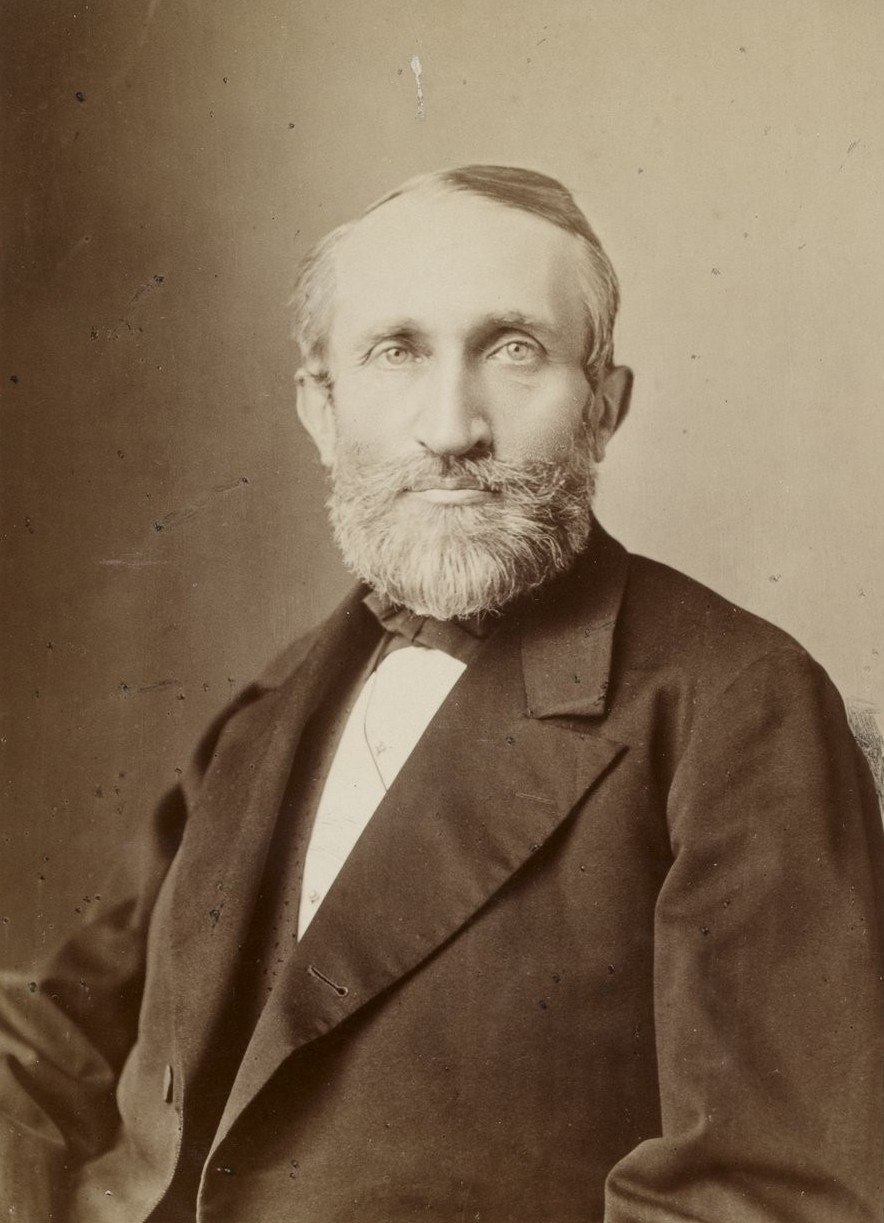
Henry Lange

Karl Julius Heinrich Lange (13 April 1821 – 30 April 1893) was a German cartographer.

== Biography ==
He was born at Stettin. He worked with Berghaus, and then labored three years in Edinburgh on Alexander Keith Johnston's Physical Atlas. Beginning in 1847, he studied under Carl Ritter and Heinrich Wilhelm Dove in Berlin. In 1855, he entered the employ of Brockhaus's firm at the head of the geographical department; retired in 1860; and in 1868 became inspector in the Berlin Statistical Bureau.

== Works ==
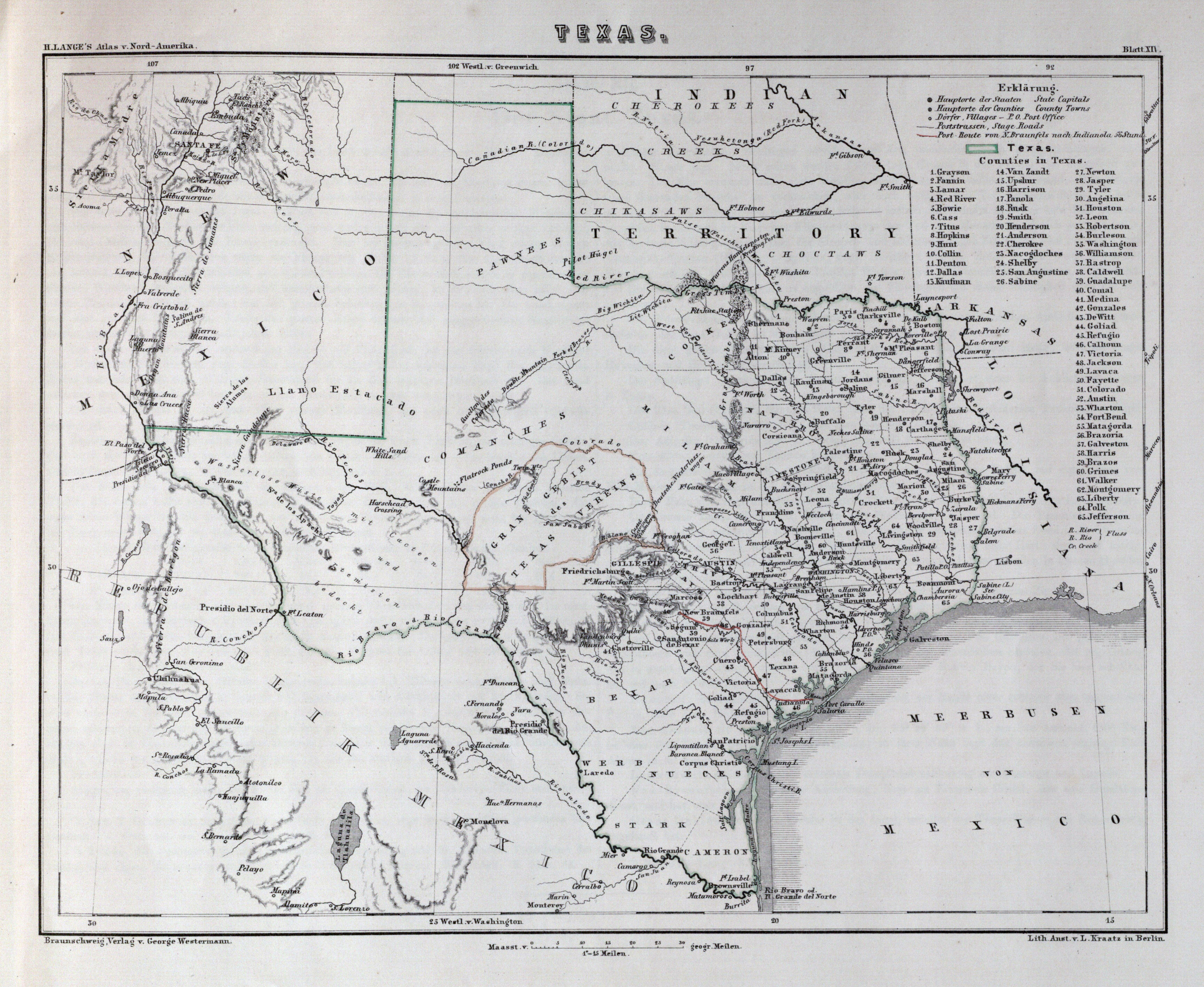
Lange, Texas, 1854

He published:

- Atlas von Nordamerika (1854)
- Brockhaus' Reiseatlas (1858–73)
- Land und Seekarte des Mittelländischen Meers (2nd ed. 1870)
- Südbrasilien, die Provinzen São Pedro do Rio Grande do Sul, Santa Catharina u.Paraná with 26 illustrations/photos and 3 maps. (2nd ed. 1885)

== Legacy ==
Lange Island and its southwest end, Lange Point, in Norway's Svalbard archipelago are named after Lange.
