= Liberty Island (California) =

Island in California

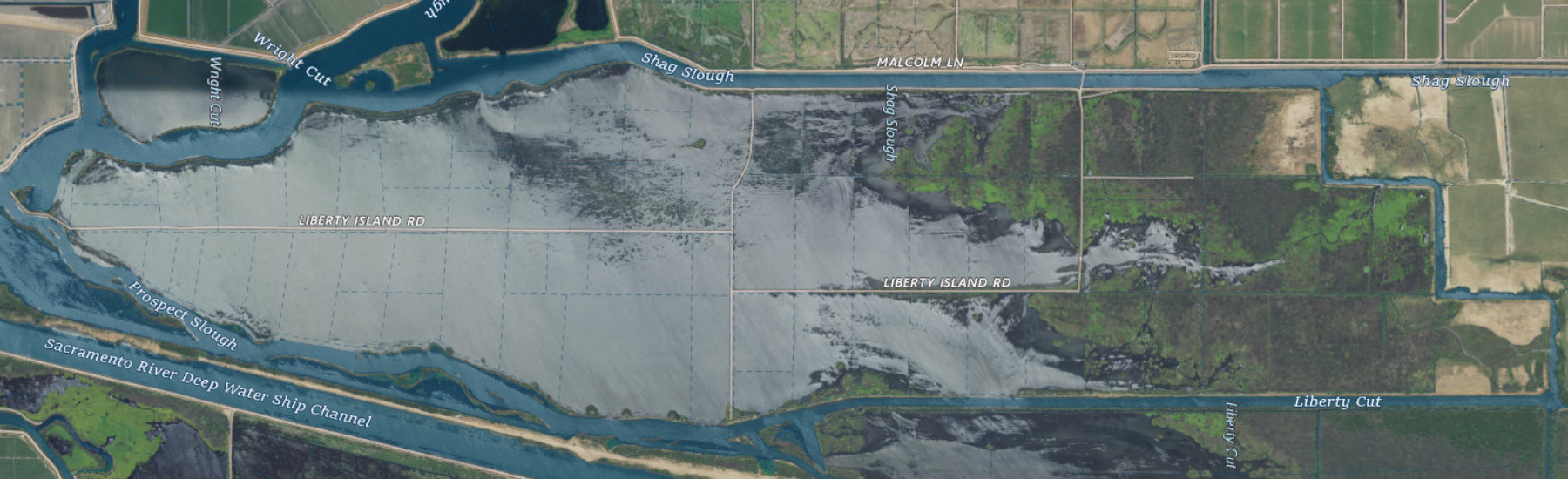
- USGS aerial imagery of Liberty Island. To the west, French Island and Moore Tract are across Shag Slough; Little Hastings Tract and Rio Vista are south across Cache Slough, Little Holland Tract is to the east across Liberty Cut, and Prospect Island is to the southeast, across both Prospect Slough and the Sacramento Deep Water Ship Channel.

- Location within Sacramento-San Joaquin River Delta Location within California Location within the United States

Geography
- Location: Northern California
- Coordinates: 38°17′13″N 121°40′43″W
- Adjacent to: Sacramento–San Joaquin River Delta
- Highest elevation: 0 ft (0 m)

Administration
- United States
- State: California
- County: Solano

Liberty Island is a mostly-flooded island in the Sacramento–San Joaquin River Delta, in Solano County, California. It is administered by Reclamation District 2093. Its coordinates are 38°17′13″N 121°40′43″W, and the United States Geological Survey measured its elevation as 0 ft (0 m) in 1981.

== Gallery ==
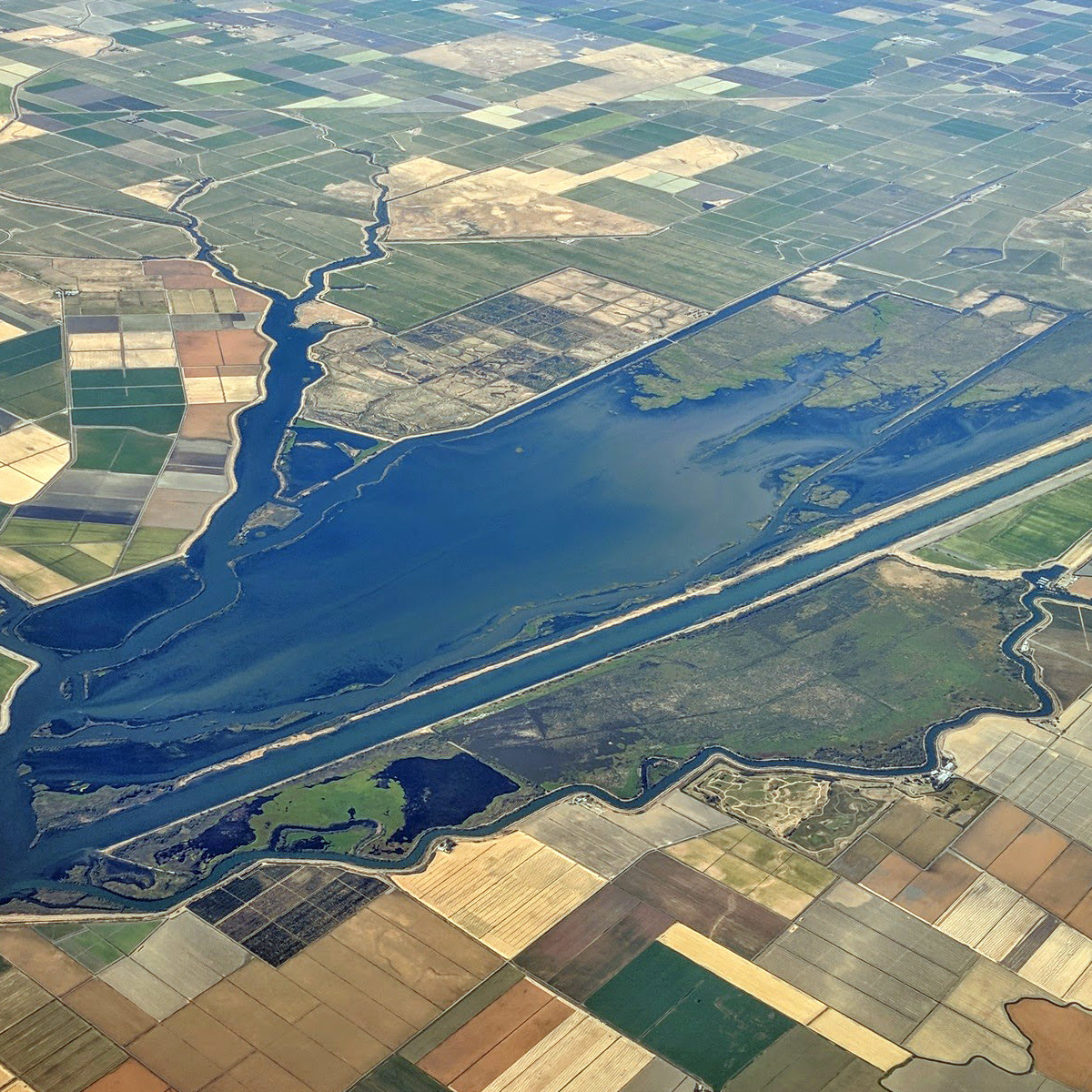

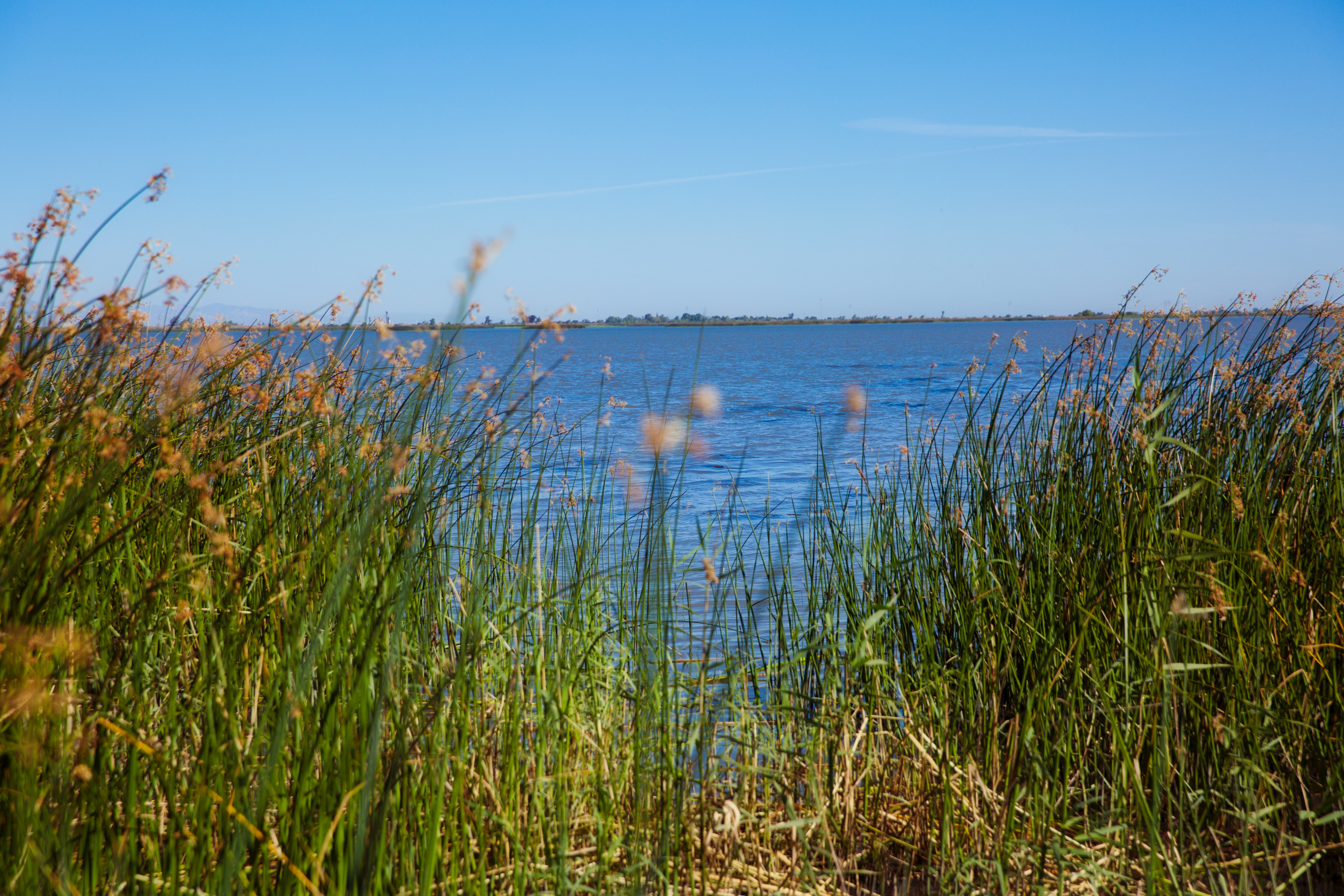

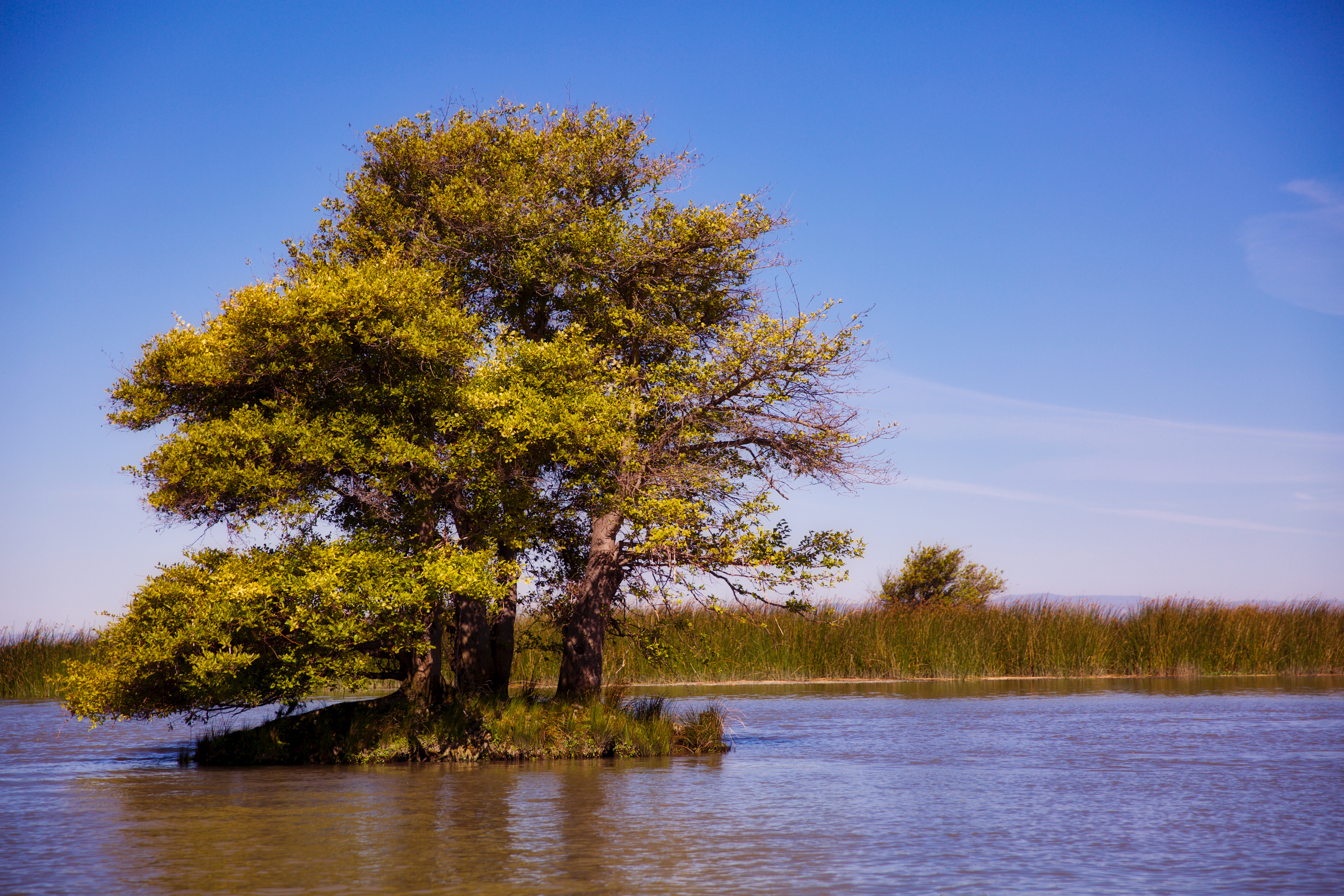

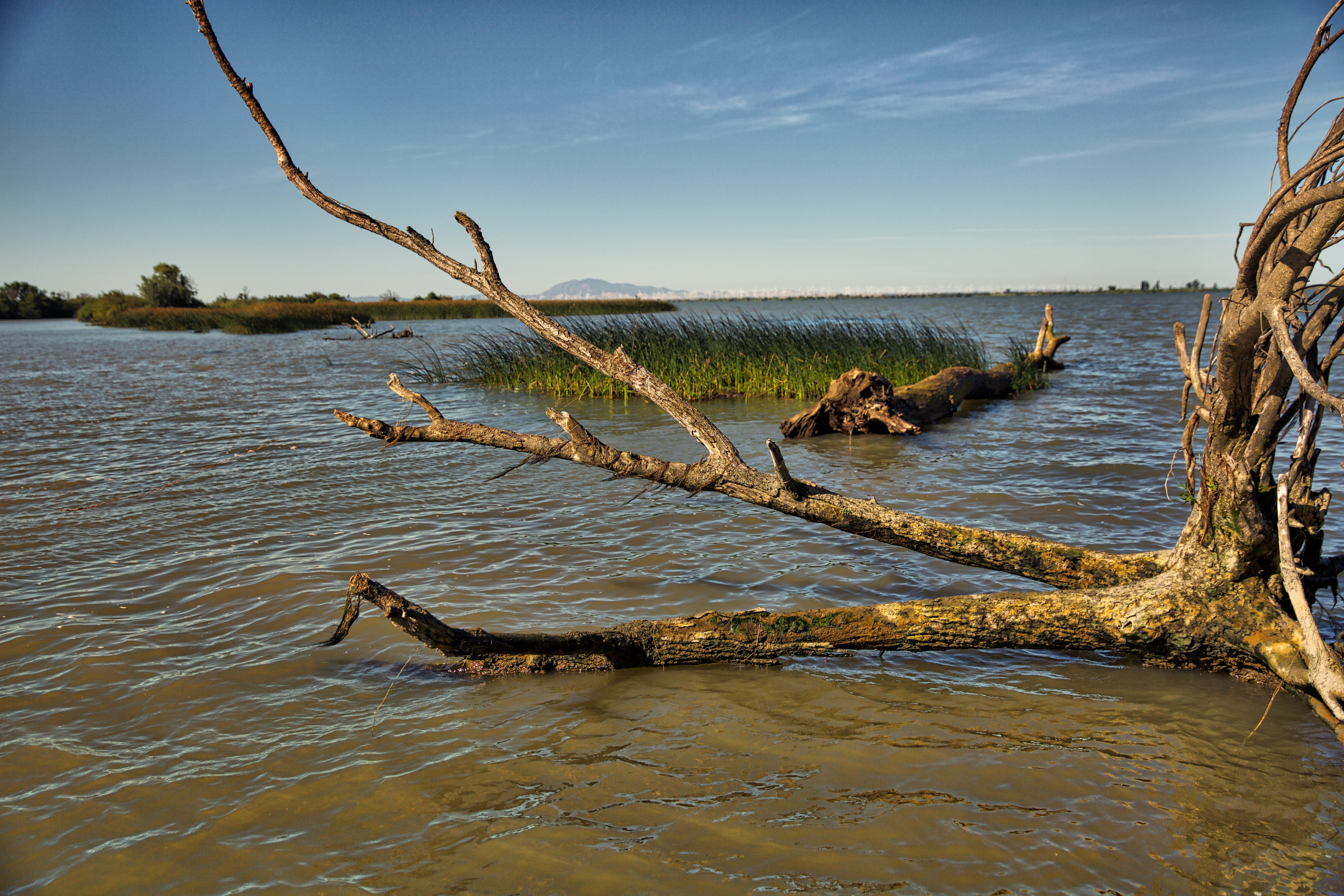

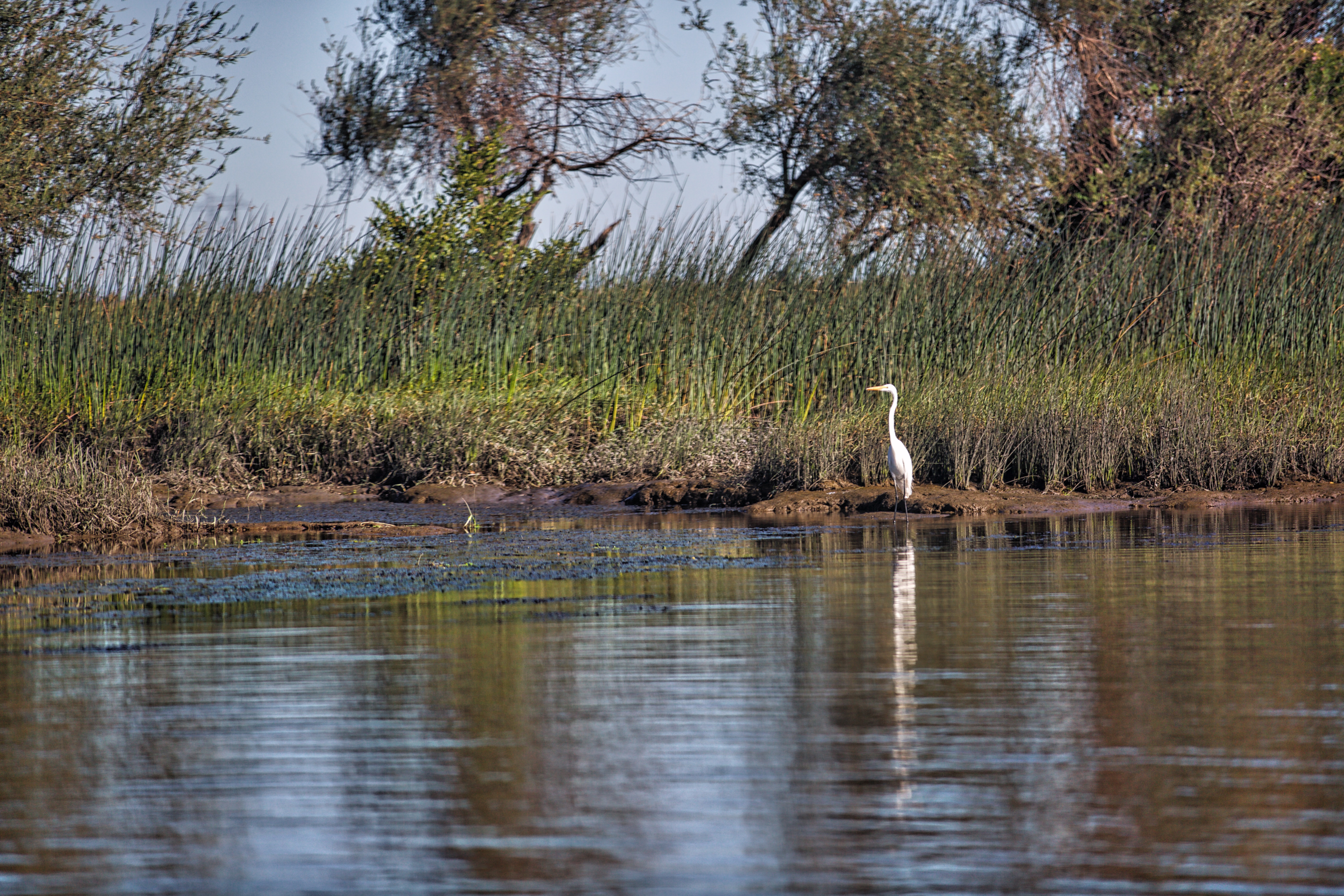

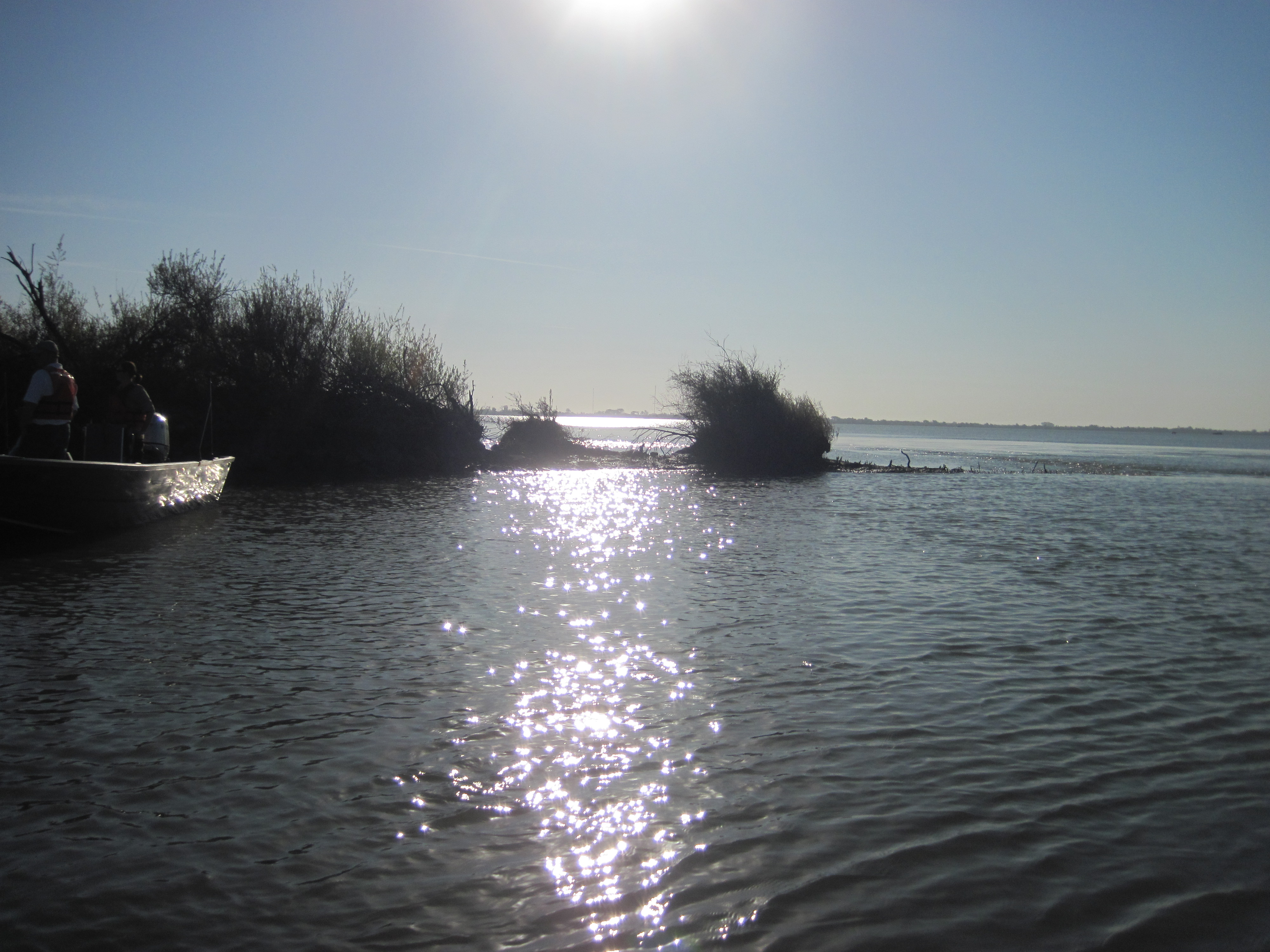

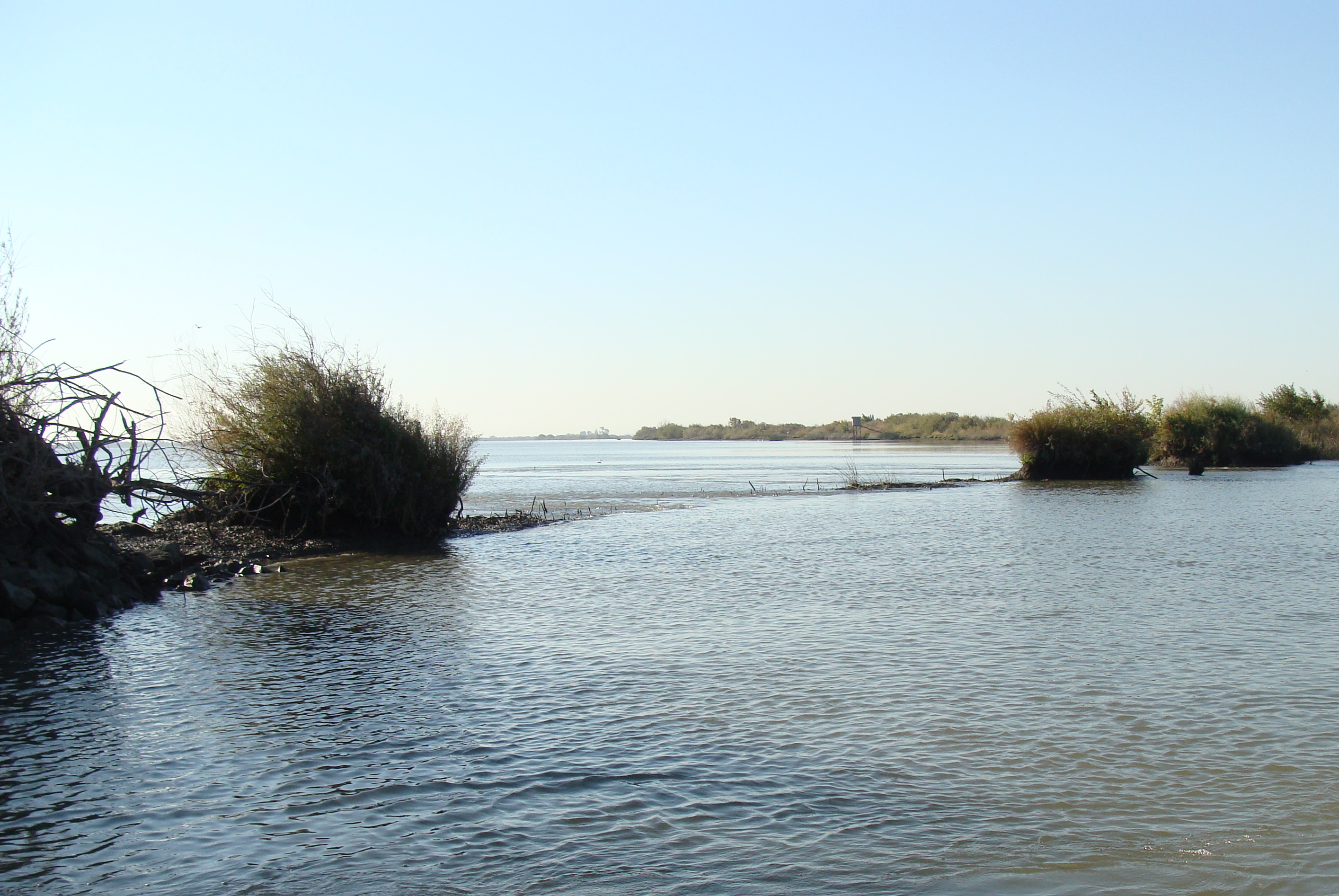

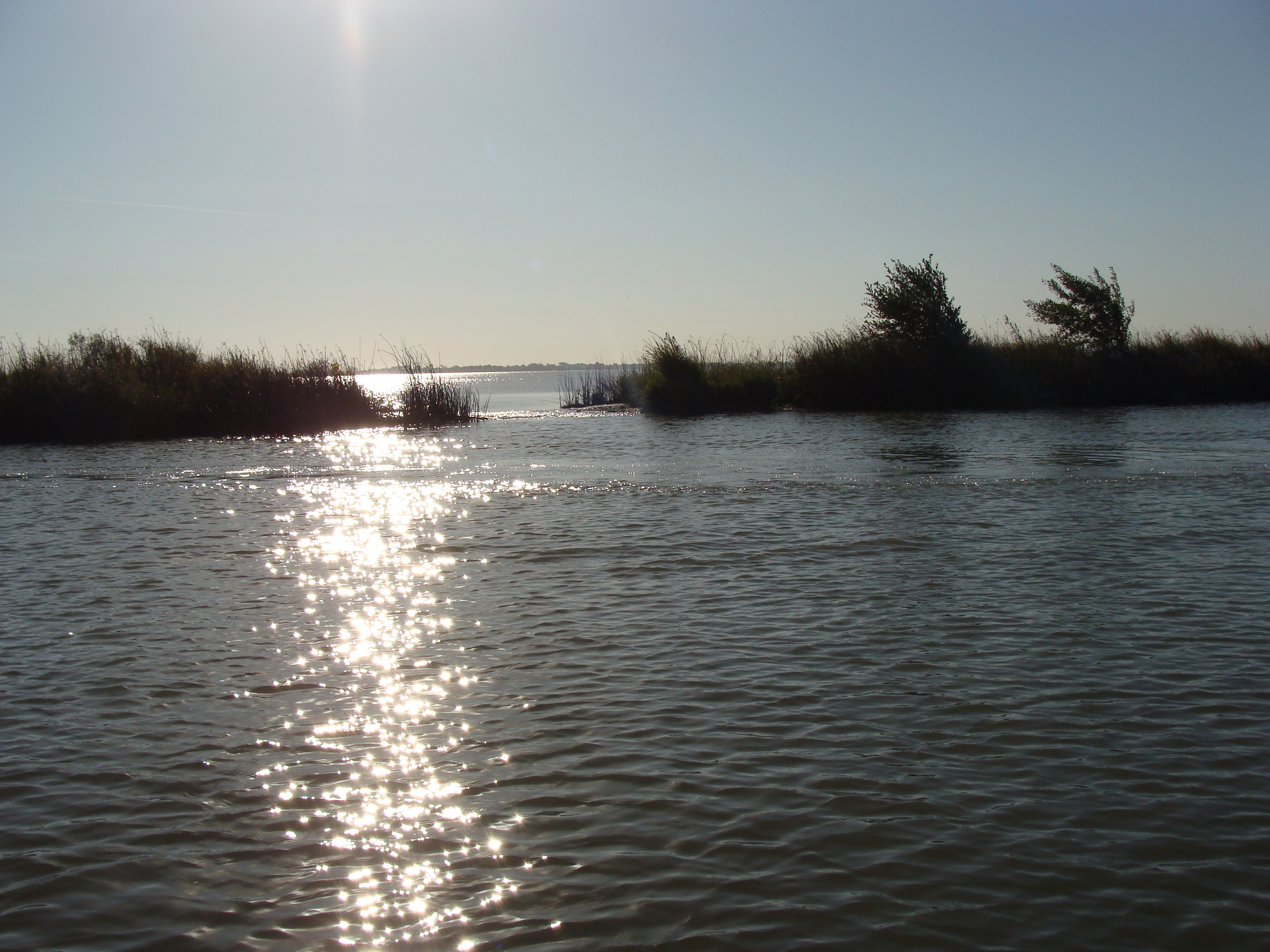

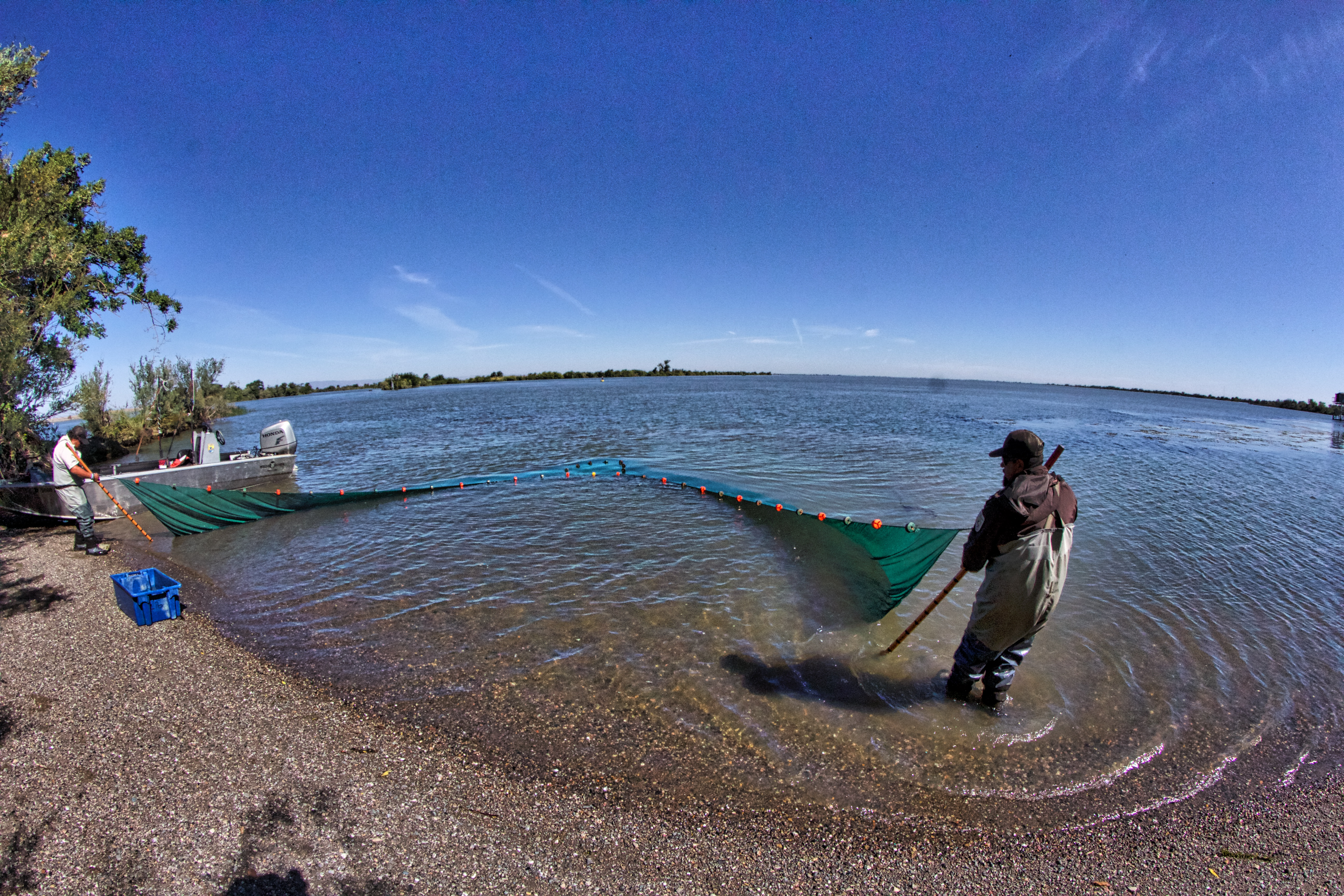
