= French Island (California) =

Island in California

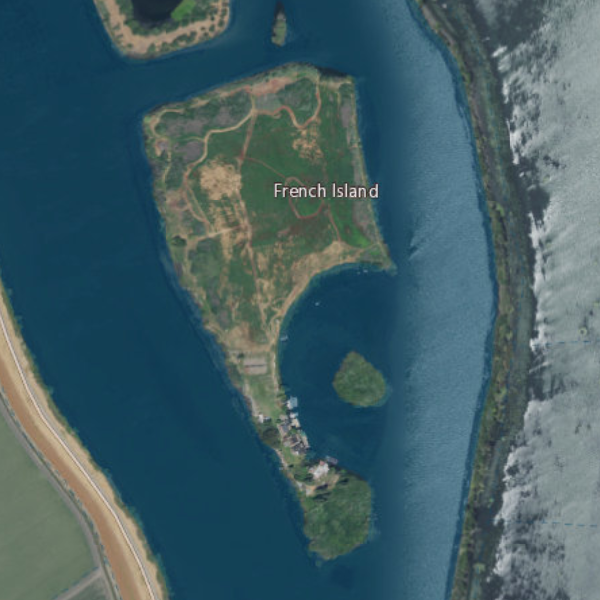
- USGS aerial imagery of French Island; Hastings Tract is across Cache Slough to the west, and the flooded Liberty Island is across Shag Slough to the east.

- Location within Sacramento-San Joaquin River Delta Location within California Location within the United States

Geography
- Location: Northern California
- Coordinates: 38°15′51″N 121°41′38″W
- Adjacent to: Sacramento–San Joaquin River Delta
- Highest elevation: 0 ft (0 m)

Administration
- United States
- State: California
- County: Solano

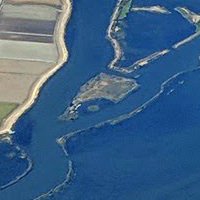
French Island seen from the southeast in a 2018 aerial photo

French Island is a small island in the Sacramento–San Joaquin River Delta. It is part of Solano County, California. Its coordinates are 38°15′51″N 121°41′38″W, and the United States Geological Survey measured its elevation as 0 ft (0 m) in 1981. It appears on USGS maps in 1952 and 1978, with the same shape and elevation.
