= Prospect Island (California) =

Island in California

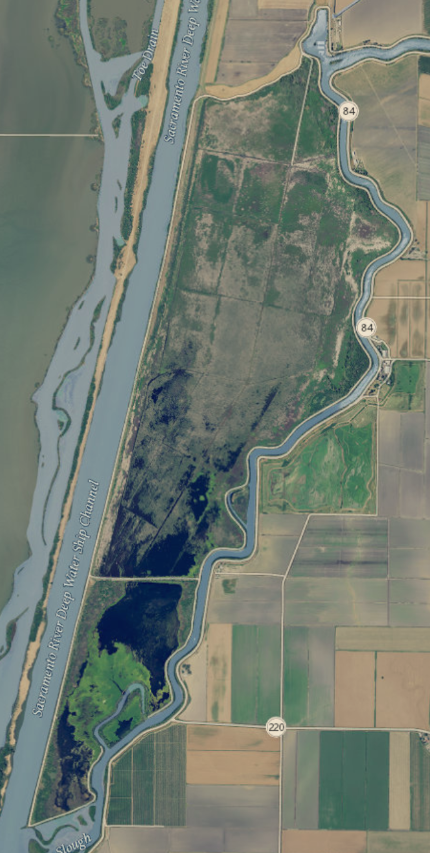
- USGS aerial imagery of the island.

- Location within Sacramento-San Joaquin River Delta Location within California Location within the United States

Geography
- Location: Northern California
- Coordinates: 38.2463030°N 121.6655110°W
- Adjacent to: Sacramento–San Joaquin River Delta

Administration
- United States
- State: California
- County: Solano

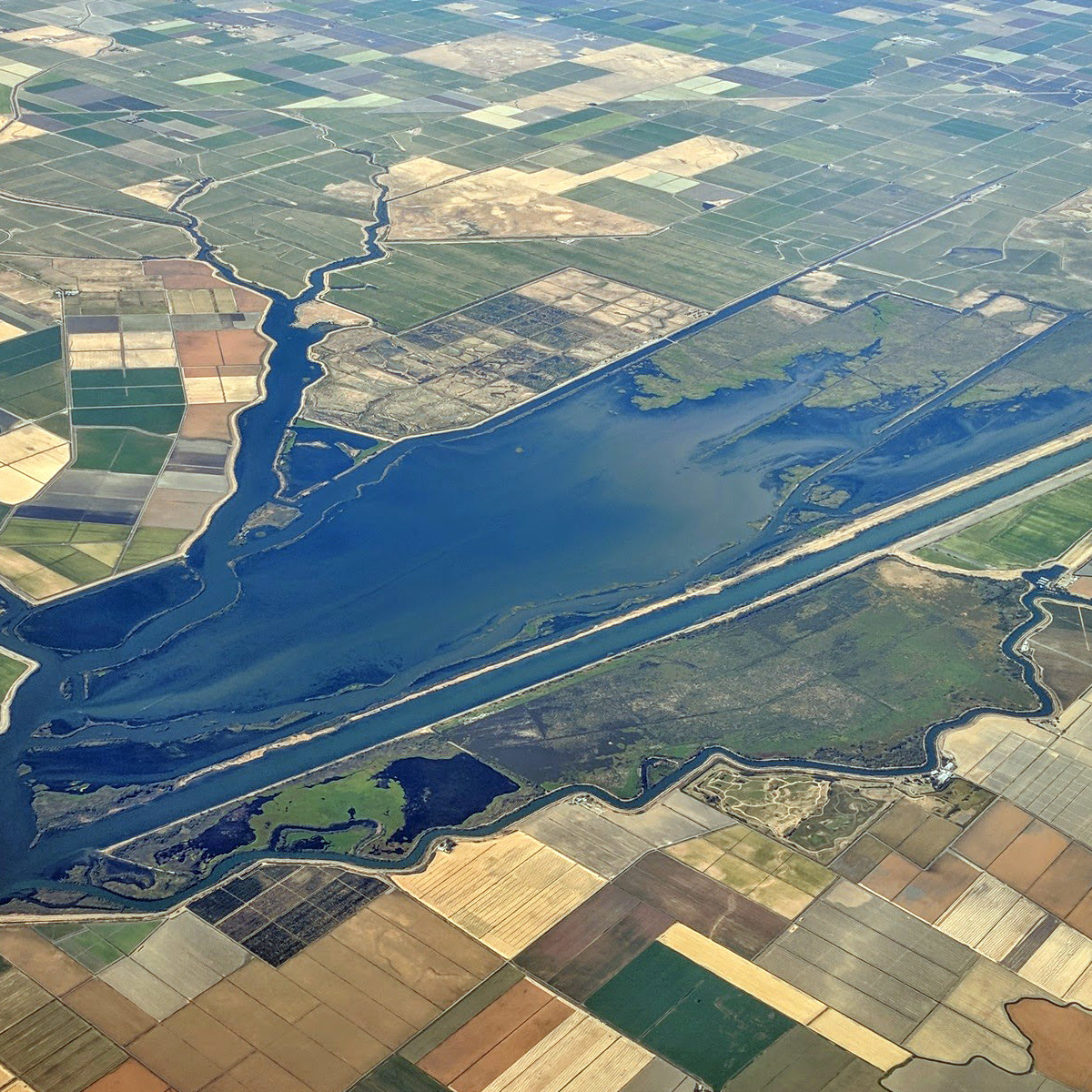
Prospect Island viewed from the southeast in a 2018 aerial photo; to its southeast is Ryer Island and to its northwest is the flooded Liberty Island

Prospect Island is a small island in the San Joaquin River delta, in California. It is part of Solano County, and managed by Reclamation District 1667. Its coordinates are 38.2463030°N 121.6655110°W. It appears on a 1952 USGS map; by 1978, survey maps show it cut diagonally by the Sacramento River Deep Water Ship Channel.

== Gallery ==
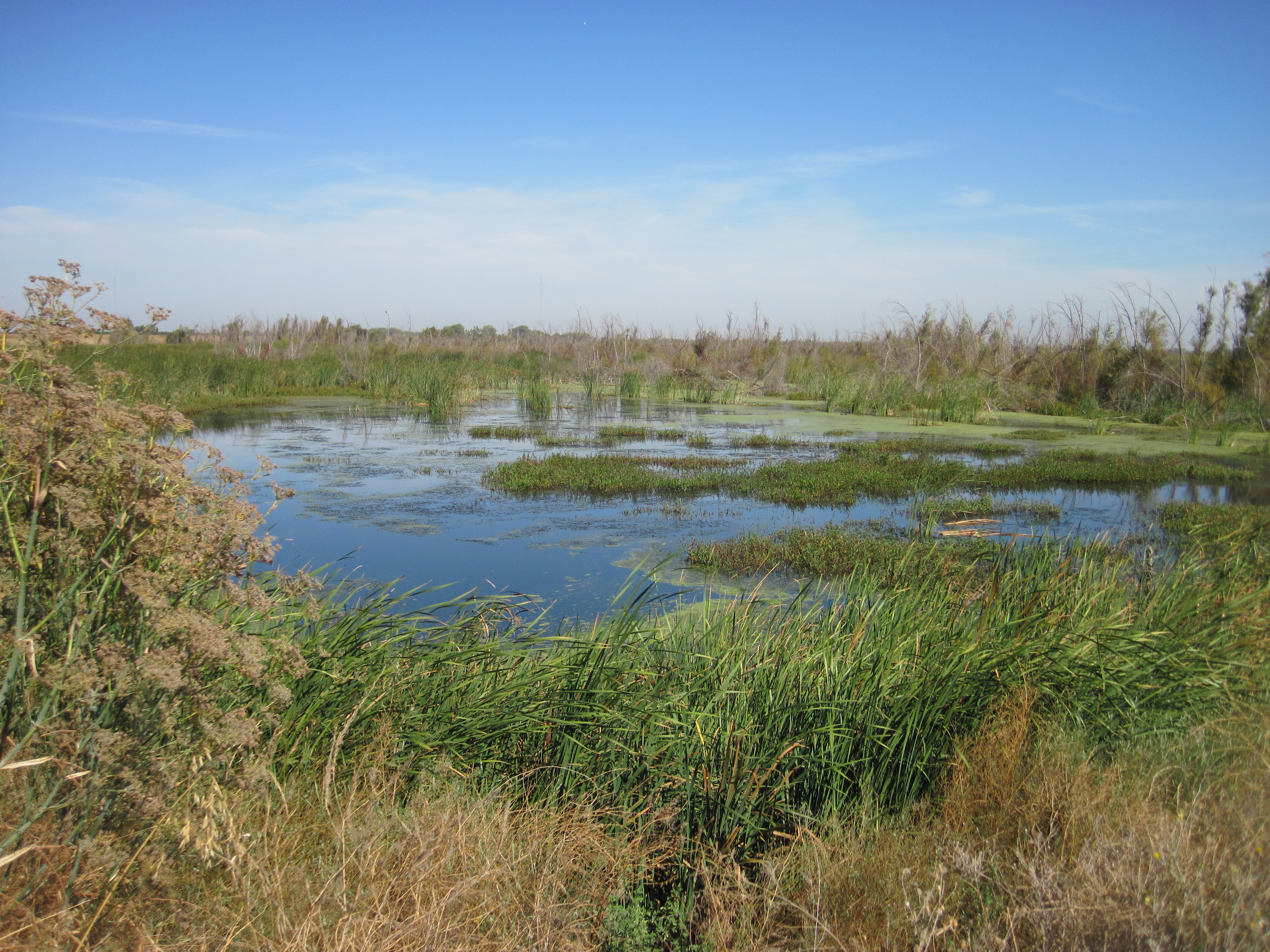

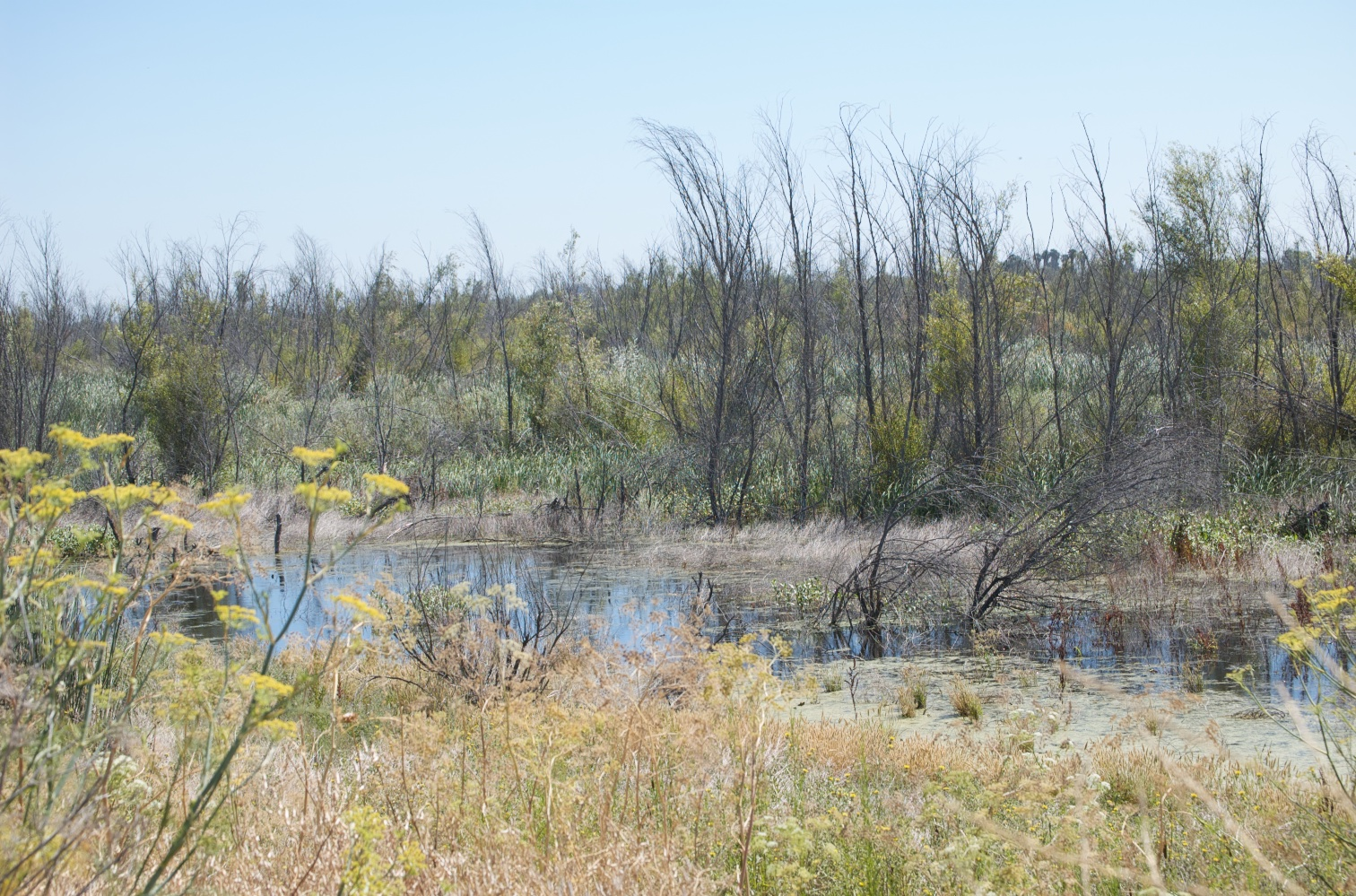

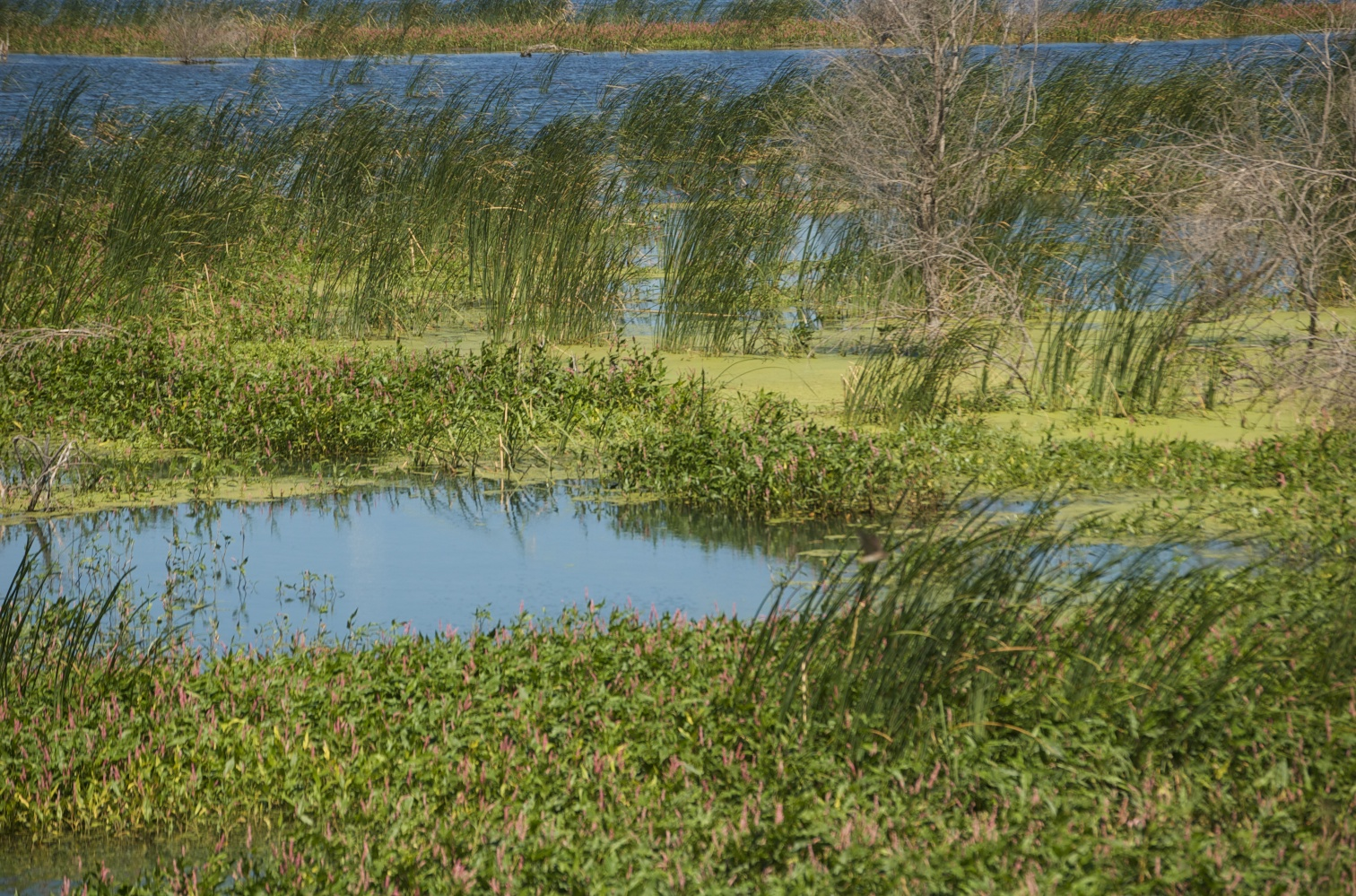

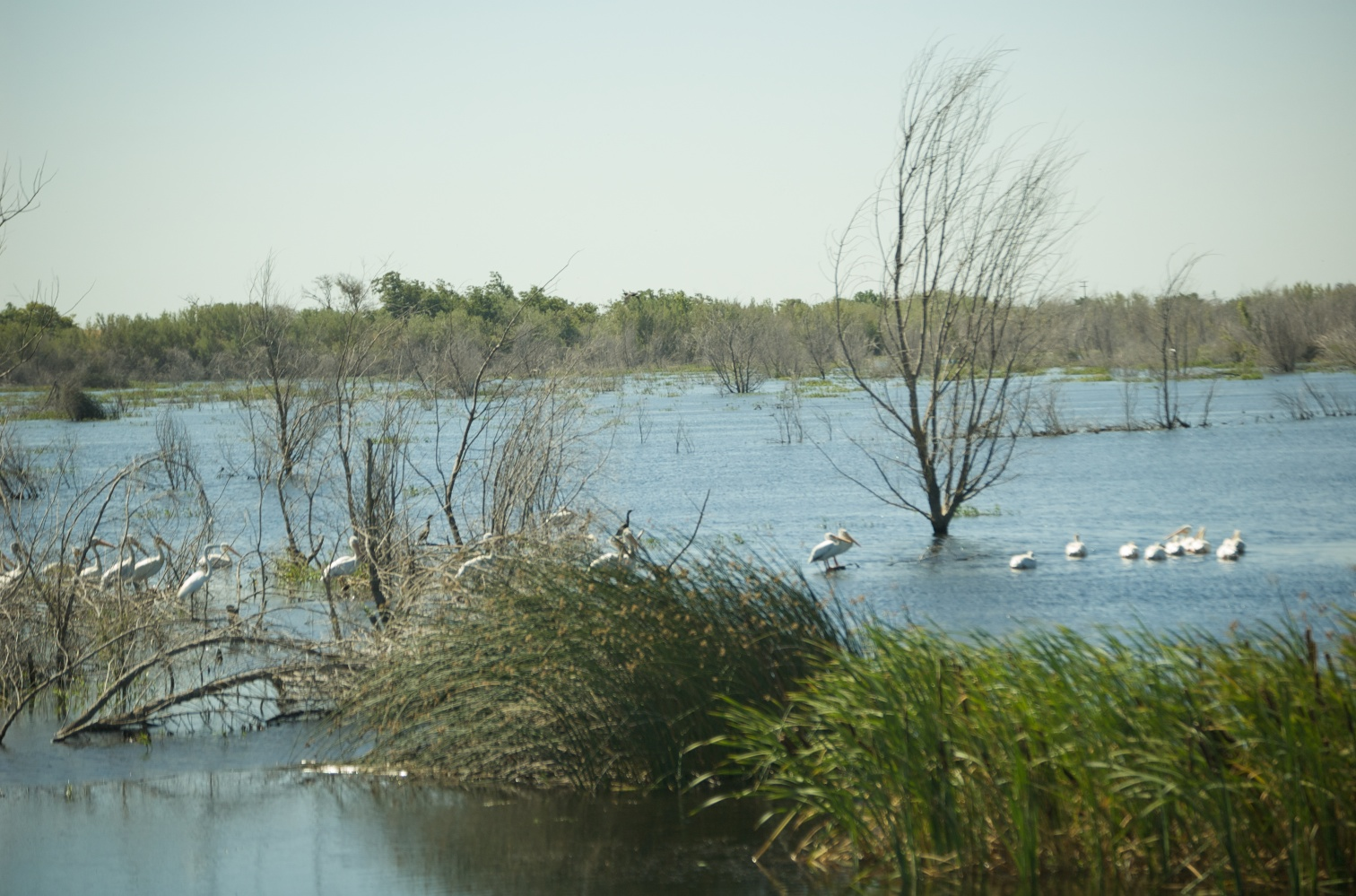
