= Moore Tract =

Island in California

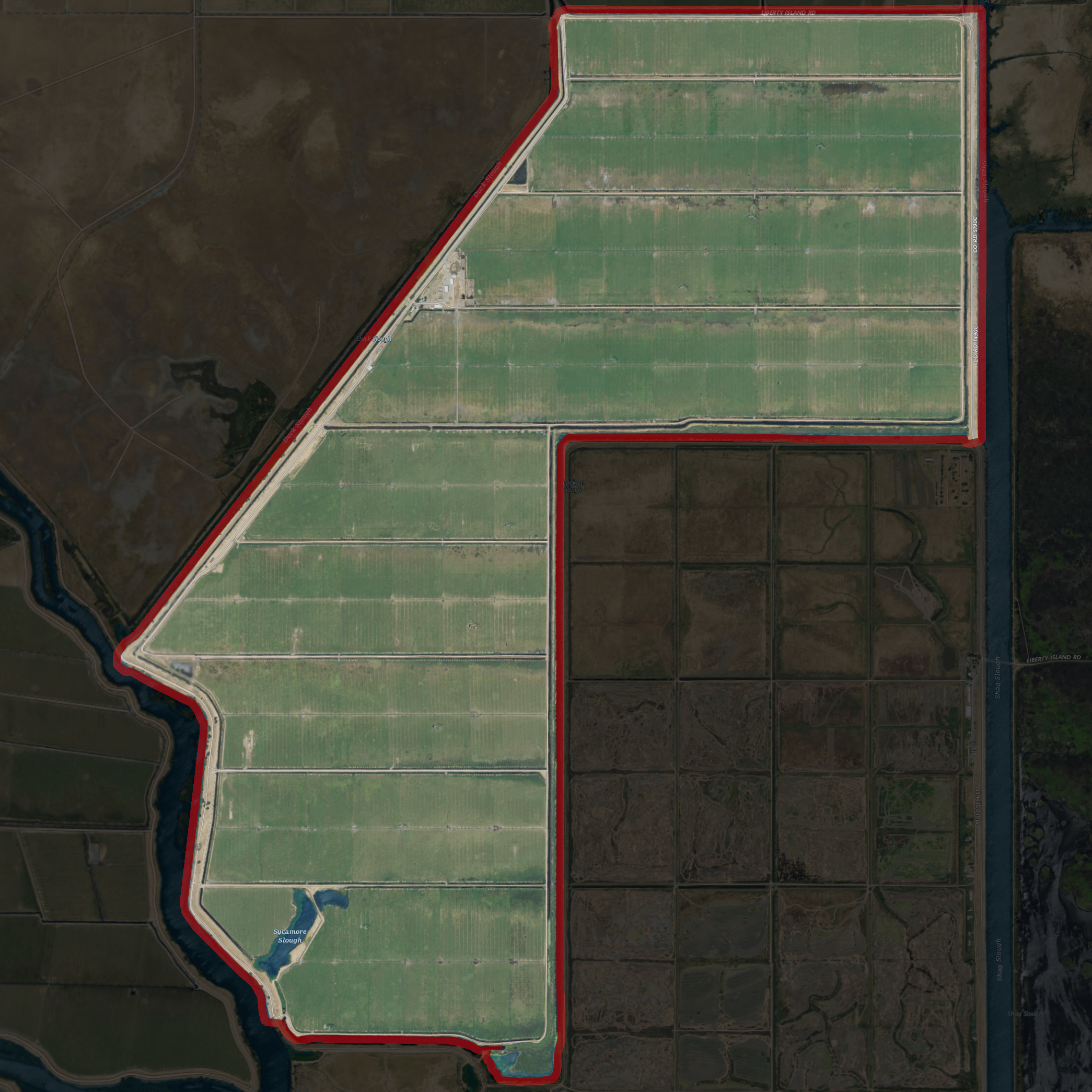
- USGS aerial imagery of Moore Tract

- Location within Sacramento-San Joaquin River Delta Location within California Location within the United States

Geography
- Location: Northern California
- Coordinates: 38°19′00″N 121°42′53″W
- Adjacent to: Sacramento–San Joaquin River Delta
- Area: 1,540 acres (620 ha)
- Highest elevation: 7 ft (2.1 m)

Administration
- United States
- State: California
- County: Solano

The Moore Tract is an island in the Sacramento–San Joaquin River Delta. It is in Solano County, California, and administered by Reclamation District 2098 since 1963. Its coordinates are 38°19′00″N 121°42′53″W, and the United States Geological Survey gave its elevation as 7 ft (2.1 m) in 1981.
