= Hastings Tract =

Island in California

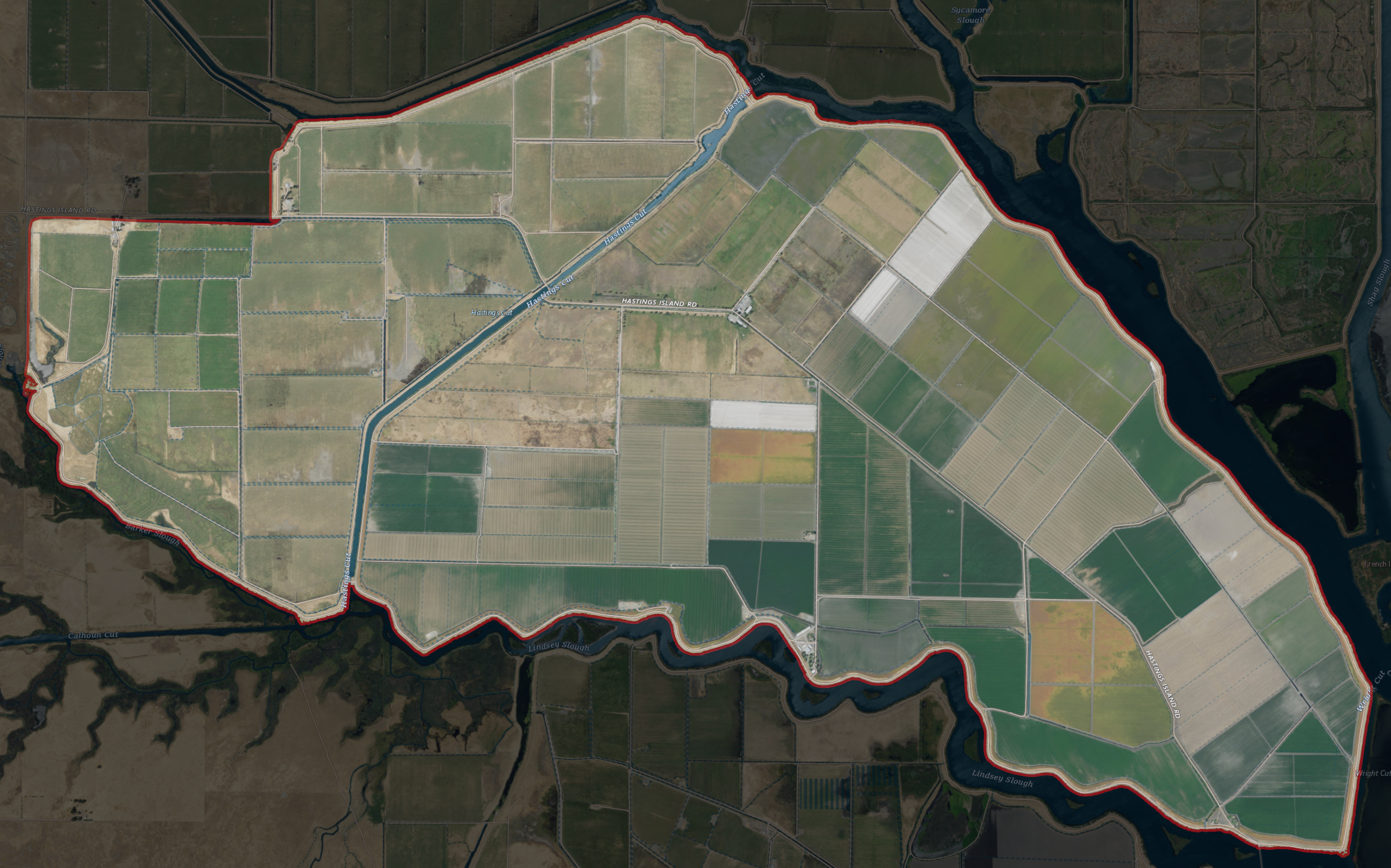
- USGS aerial imagery of Hastings Tract

- Location within Sacramento-San Joaquin River Delta Location within California Location within the United States

Geography
- Location: Northern California
- Coordinates: 38°16′19″N 121°43′45″W
- Adjacent to: Sacramento–San Joaquin River Delta
- Area: 6,400 acres (2,600 ha)
- Highest elevation: 0 ft (0 m)

Administration
- United States
- State: California
- County: Solano

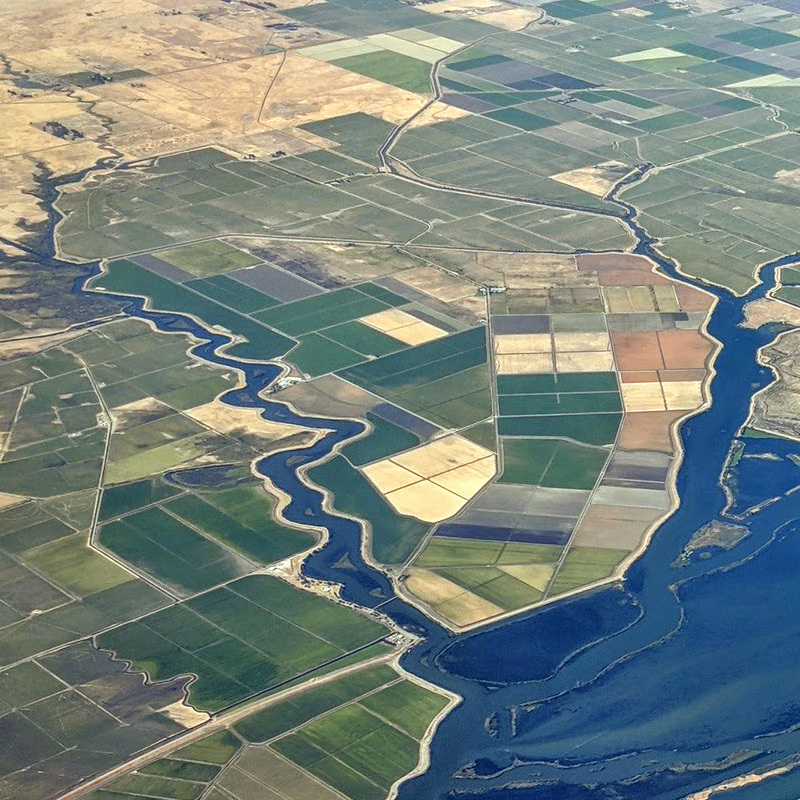
Hastings Tract from the southeast, in an aerial photo from 2018

The Hastings Tract is an island in the Sacramento–San Joaquin River Delta. It is part of Solano County, California, and managed by Reclamation District 2060. Its coordinates are 38°16′19″N 121°43′45″W, and the United States Geological Survey measured its elevation as 0 ft (0 m) in 1981.
