= Little Holland Tract =

Island in California, U.S.

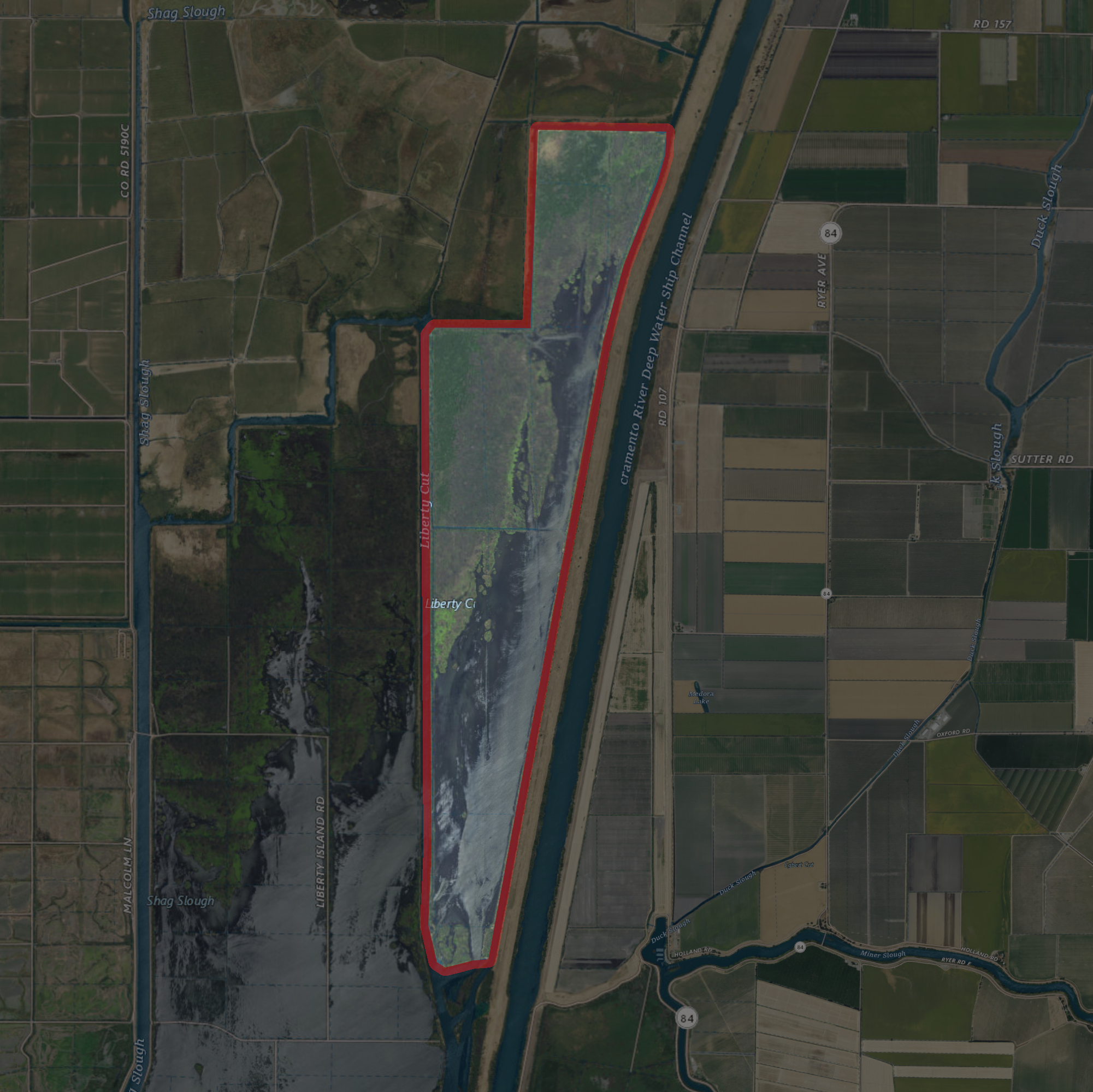
- USGS aerial imagery of Little Holland Tract

- Location within Sacramento-San Joaquin River Delta Location within California Location within the United States

Geography
- Location: Northern California
- Coordinates: 38°19′27″N 121°39′20″W
- Adjacent to: Sacramento–San Joaquin River Delta
- Highest elevation: 13 ft (4 m)

Administration
- United States
- State: California
- County: Yolo

The Little Holland Tract is a partially submerged island in the Sacramento–San Joaquin River Delta, in Yolo County, California. Its coordinates are 38°19′27″N 121°39′20″W, and the United States Geological Survey gave its elevation as 13 ft (4.0 m) in 1981. It appears on a 1952 USGS map as a large rectangular tract; by 1978, survey maps show it cut diagonally by the Sacramento River Deep Water Ship Channel.
