= Little Hastings Tract =

Island in California

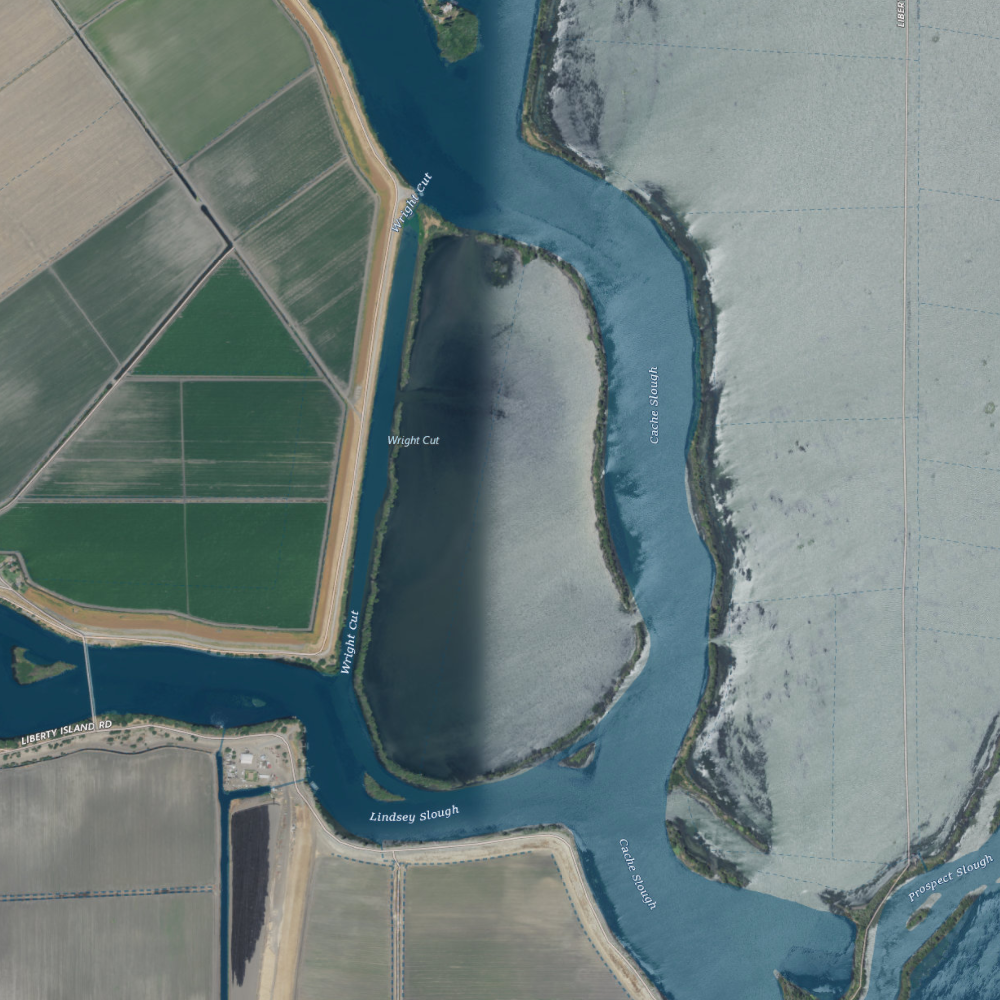
- USGS aerial imagery of Little Hastings Tract

- Location within Sacramento-San Joaquin River Delta Location within California Location within the United States

Geography
- Location: Northern California
- Coordinates: 38°15′02″N 121°41′32″W
- Adjacent to: Sacramento–San Joaquin River Delta
- Highest elevation: 0 ft (0 m)

Administration
- United States
- State: California
- County: Solano

Little Hastings Tract is a mostly submerged island in the Sacramento–San Joaquin River Delta. It is in Solano County, California. Its coordinates are 38°15′02″N 121°41′32″W, and the United States Geological Survey gave its elevation as 0 ft (0 m) in 1981. It appears, above water, on a 1978 USGS map.
