= Orwood Tract =

Island in California

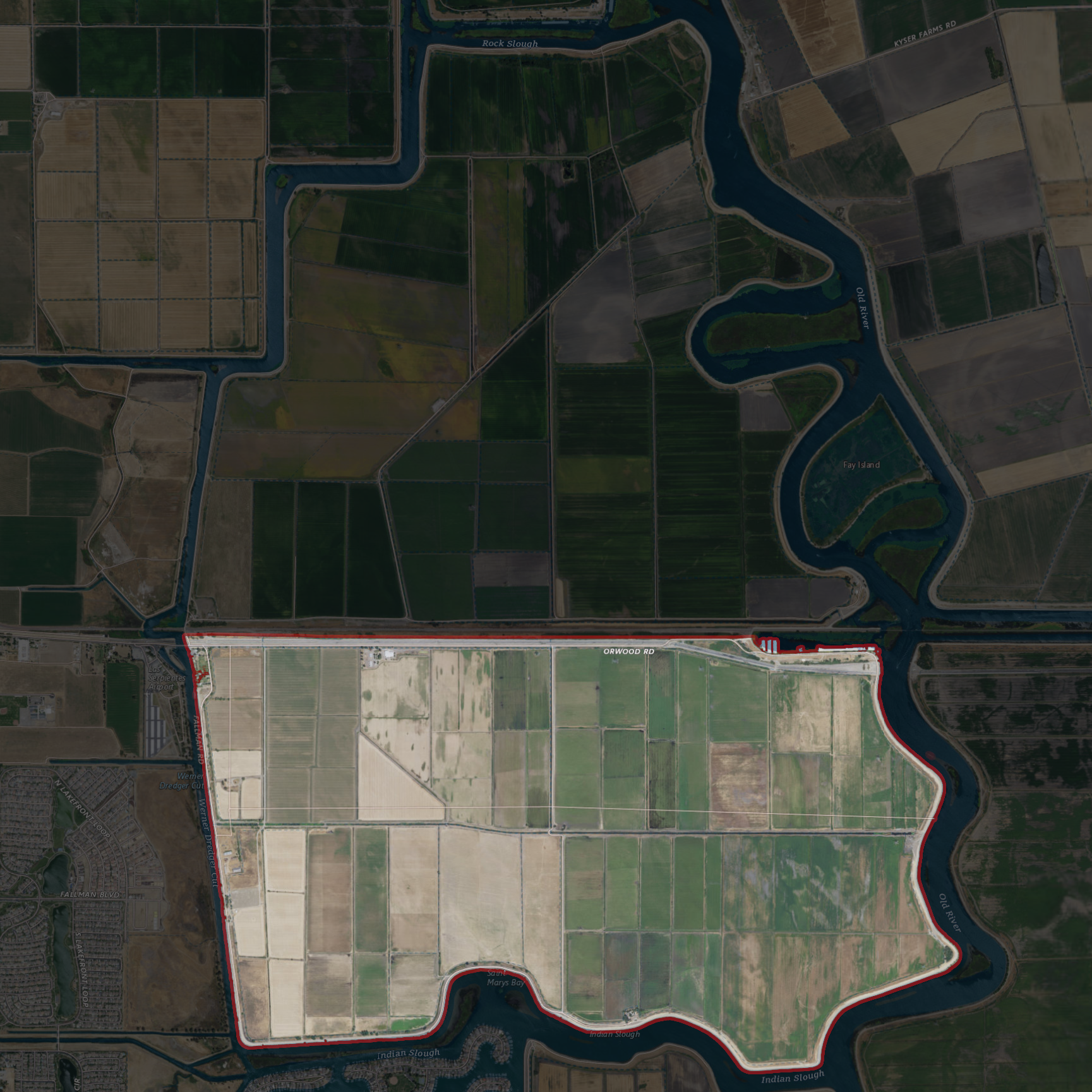
- USGS aerial imagery of Orwood Tract

- Location within Sacramento-San Joaquin River Delta Location within California Location within the United States

Geography
- Location: Northern California
- Coordinates: 37°55′42″N 121°35′00″W
- Adjacent to: Sacramento–San Joaquin River Delta
- Highest elevation: 13 ft (4 m)

Administration
- United States
- State: California
- County: Contra Costa

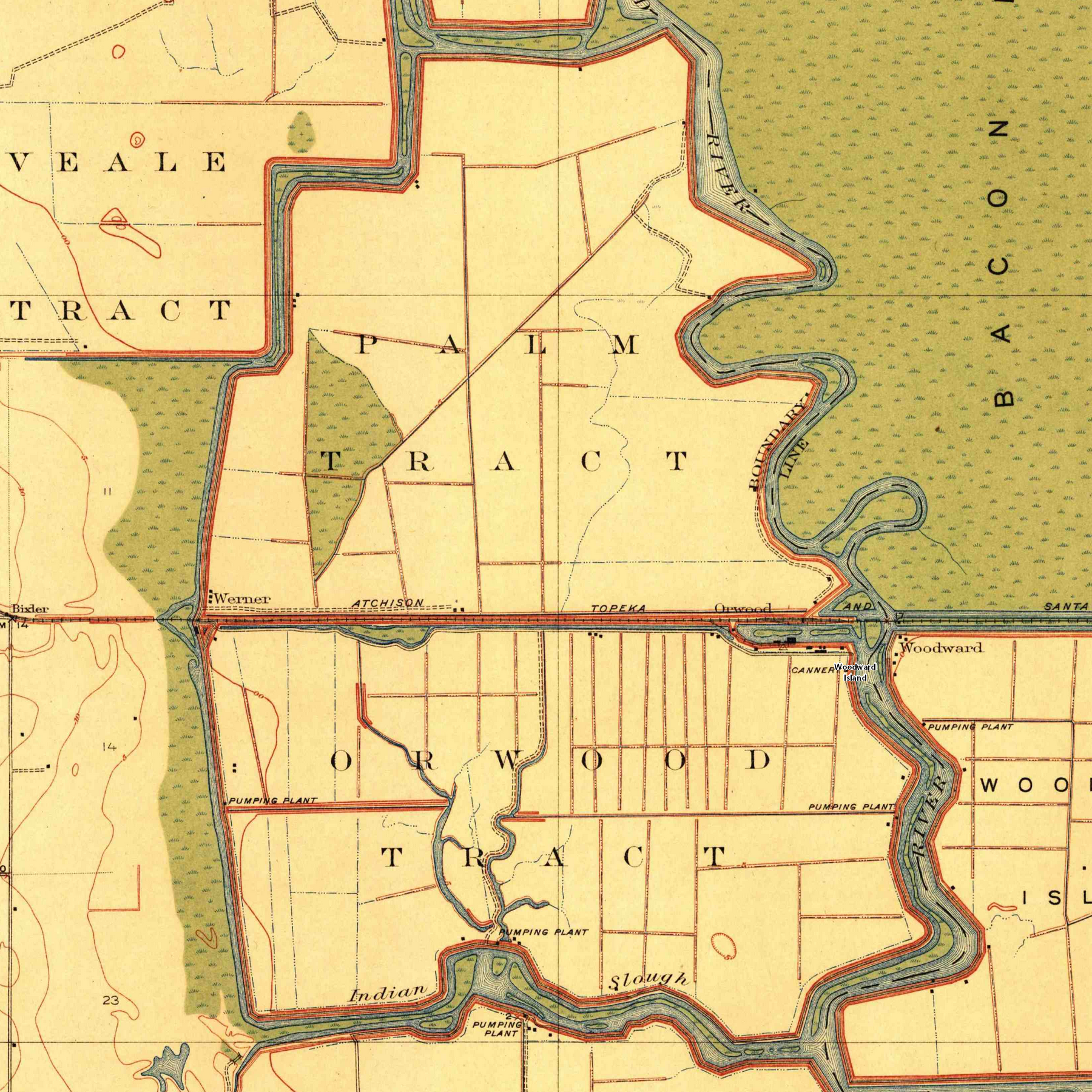
United States Geological Survey map of Palm and Orwood Tracts in 1913.

The Orwood Tract is an island in the Sacramento–San Joaquin River Delta. It is part of Contra Costa County, California. It, along with Palm Tract to the north, are managed by Reclamation District 2024 (Orwood and Palm Tracts). Its coordinates are 37°55′42″N 121°35′00″W, and the United States Geological Survey measured its elevation as 13 ft (4.0 m) in 1981. It appears on 1913 and 1952 United States Geological Survey maps of the area.
