= Balboa Peninsula, Newport Beach =

Neighborhood of Newport Beach, California

Coordinates: 33°36′10″N 117°54′15″W

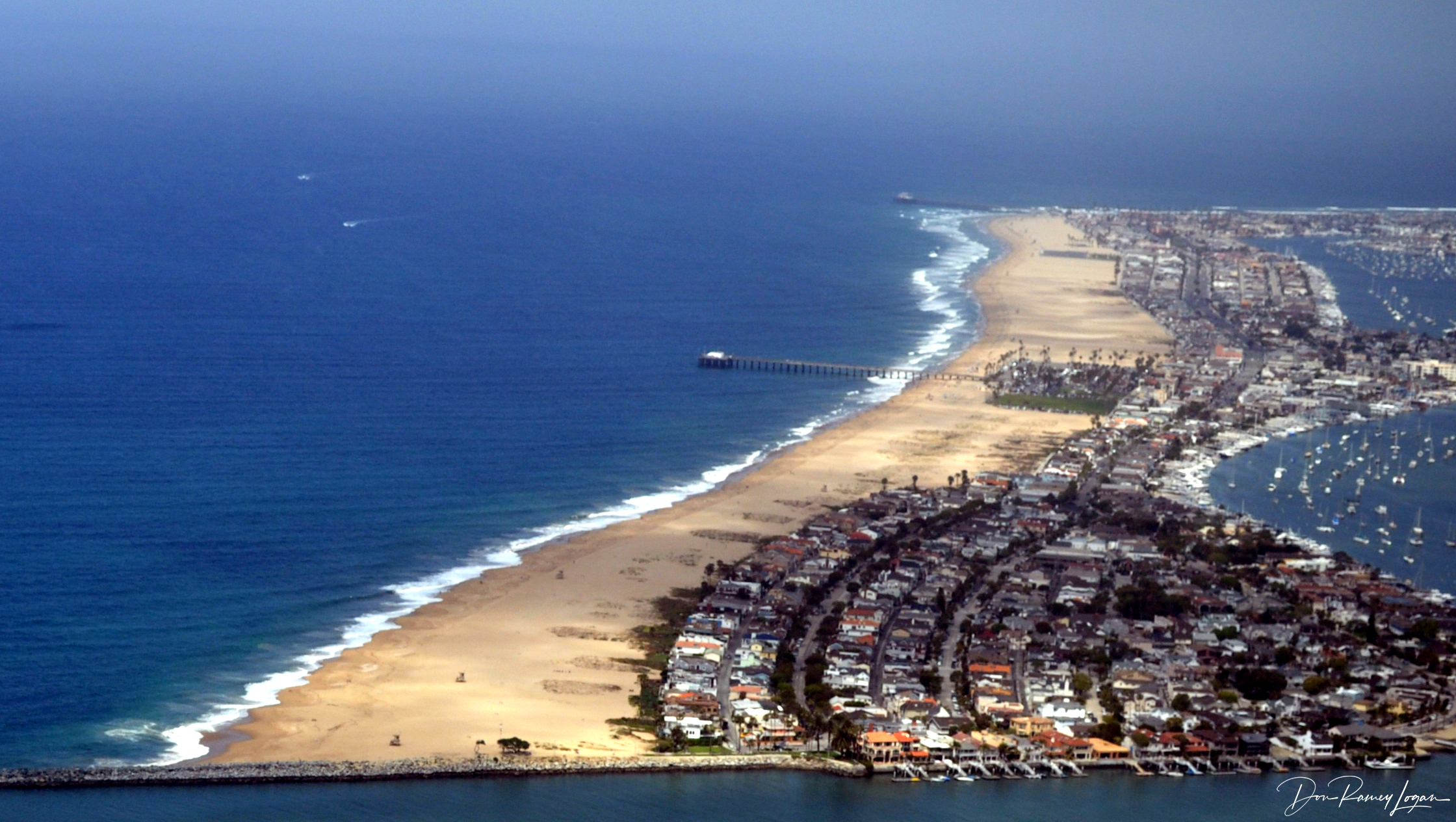
The Balboa Peninsula

The Balboa Peninsula (also referred to as "Balboa" or "the Peninsula") is a neighborhood of the city of Newport Beach, California. It is named after Spanish explorer Vasco Núñez de Balboa, the first European to sight the Pacific from the Americas. Balboa is primarily residential with some commercial areas.

== History ==
In geological terms, the Balboa Peninsula is a sandspit. The present form of the Peninsula can be attributed to an 1825 flood which rerouted the Santa Ana River into West Newport. This change caused sand to accumulate, and by 1857 the Peninsula had spread to half its present length. In 1920, the river was rerouted by the Bitter Point Dam to its present outlet in Huntington Beach.

In 1888, the McFadden family, which had arrived in California c. 1849, decided their shipping business would be more successful if they moved it from the inner shores of the bay to the oceanfront, where it was connected by rail to Santa Ana. They built McFadden Wharf at the location where the Newport Pier is today. In 1899, the Federal Government allocated funds for major improvements to a new harbor at San Pedro, which would become Southern California's major seaport. The McFadden Wharf and railroad were sold to the Southern Pacific Railroad that same year, signaling the end of Newport Bay as a commercial shipping center.

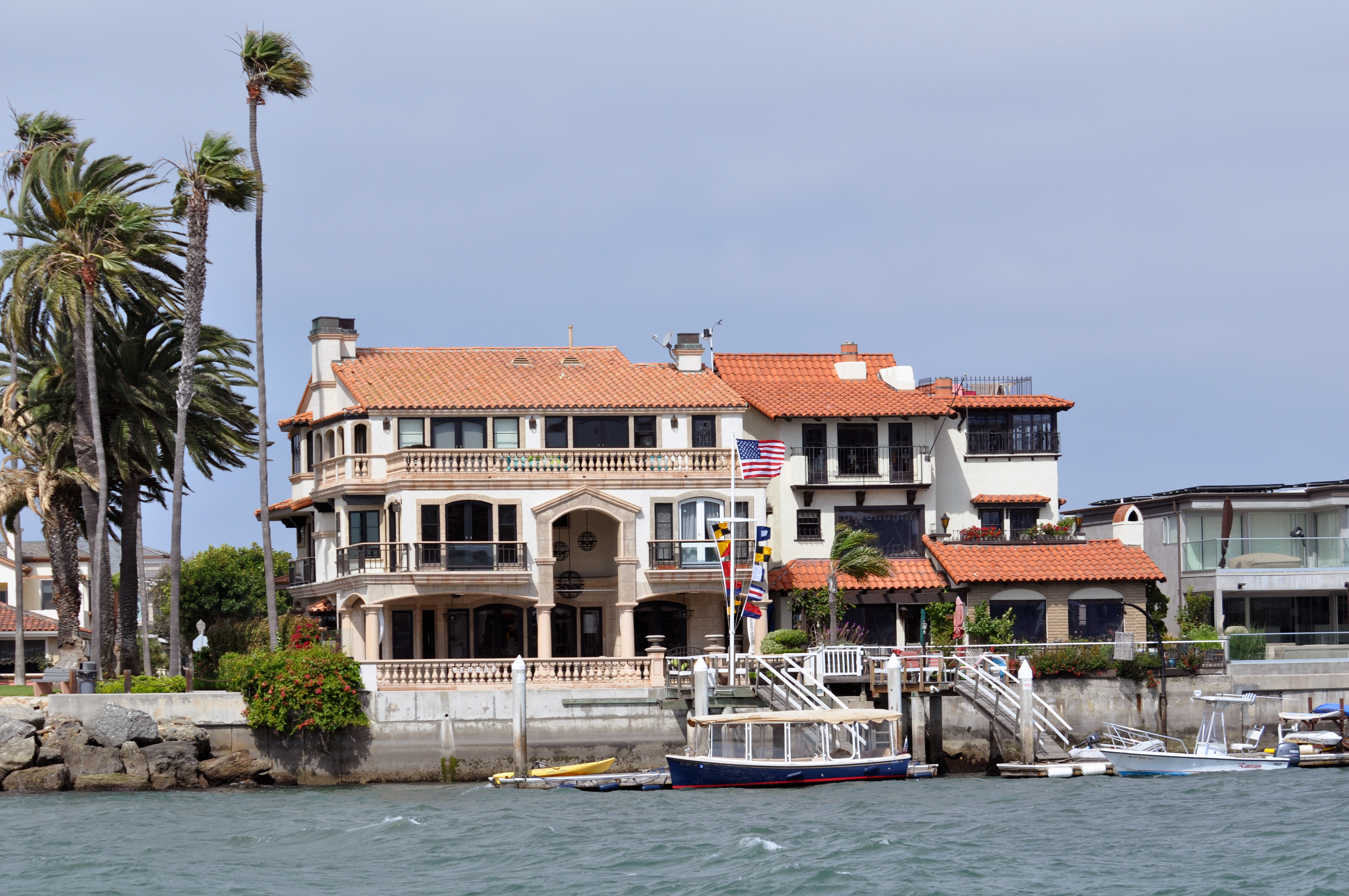
Harborfront home, Newport Beach

In 1902, James McFadden sold his Newport townsite and about half of the peninsula to William Collins, who saw Newport Bay's resort and recreation potential. Collins took on Henry E. Huntington as a partner in the Newport Beach Company. Huntington had acquired the Pacific Electric railway system and used it to promote new communities outside of Los Angeles.

In 1905, the Pacific Electric Balboa Line was extended to Newport. Collins began dredging a channel on the north side of the bay and deposited the sand and silt on tidelands that would become Balboa Island. Newport Harbor was still largely undredged.

== Boundaries ==
The peninsula acts as a jetty enclosing the Newport Harbor and Newport Beach's eight islands. The Peninsula is connected from the land via Pacific Coast Highway (SR 1) at Balboa Boulevard, via Bridge at Newport Boulevard (SR 55) from SR 1 (and from Via Lido which connects via bridge to Lido Isle, via Bridge from Newport Island, via Bridge from Bay Isle and via Balboa Island Ferry from Balboa Boulevard and Palm Street to Balboa Island which is connected via bridge from Jamboree Road and SR 1. The west end of Balboa Island connects via bridge to Collins Isle and the east end connects via bridge over the Grand Canal to the Little Island. The center of the Peninsula is called Balboa Village and the end of the Peninsula is called Balboa Peninsula Point. Balboa Pier is near the Balboa Island Ferry in Balboa Village and about two miles toward SR 1 is Newport Pier at McFadden Square. Linda Isle and Harbor Island connect via bridge from Bayside Drive off SR 1.

== Landmarks ==
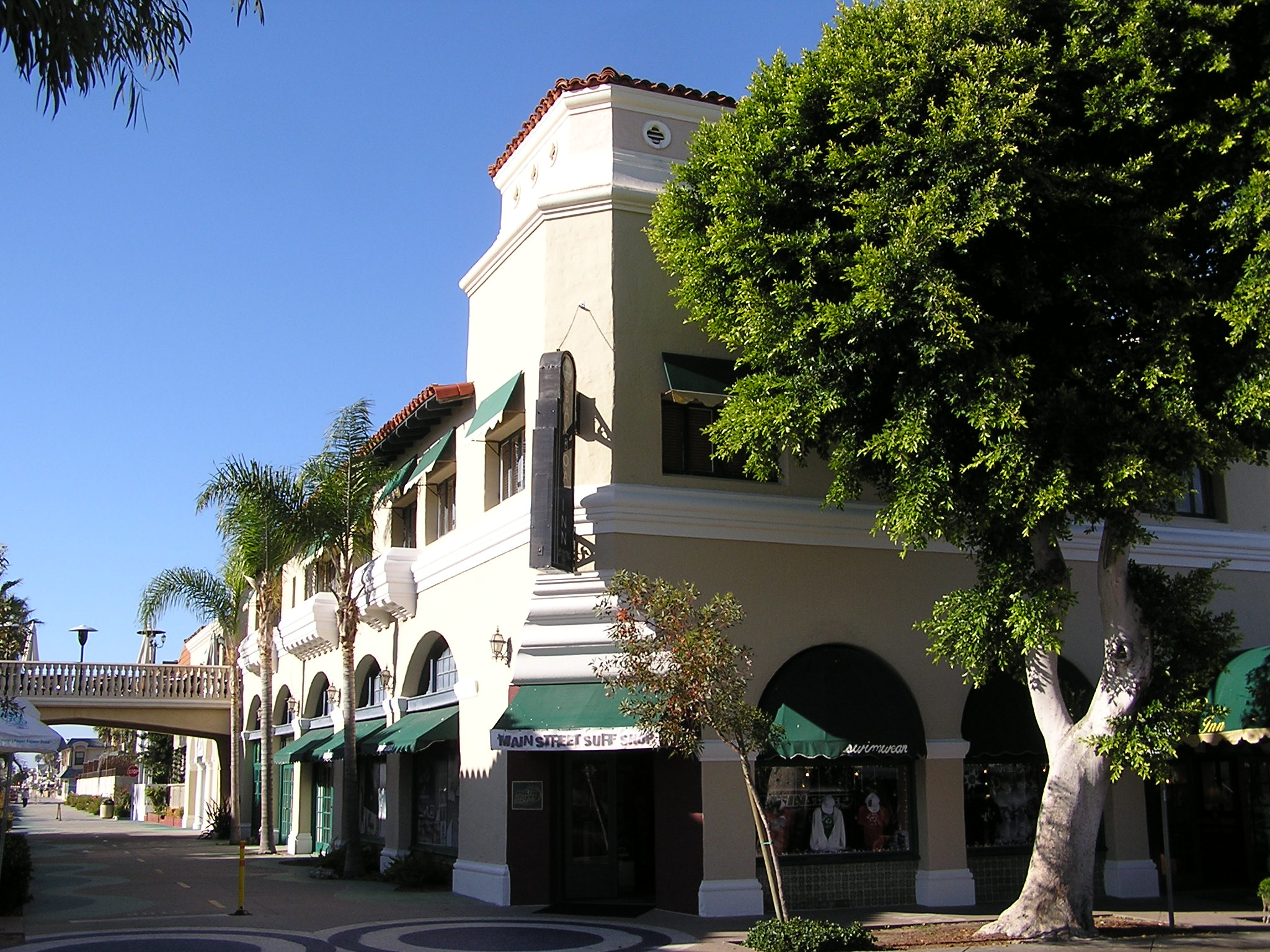
The Balboa Inn

- Balboa Pavilion (established 1906)
- Balboa Theater (established 1928)
- Balboa Inn (established 1929)
- Balboa Fun Zone
- Balboa Island Ferry
- Balboa Pavilion
- Balboa Pier
- The Crab Cooker
- Dory Fishing Fleet
- Lovell Beach House
- Newport Elementary School
- The Wedge

== Gallery ==
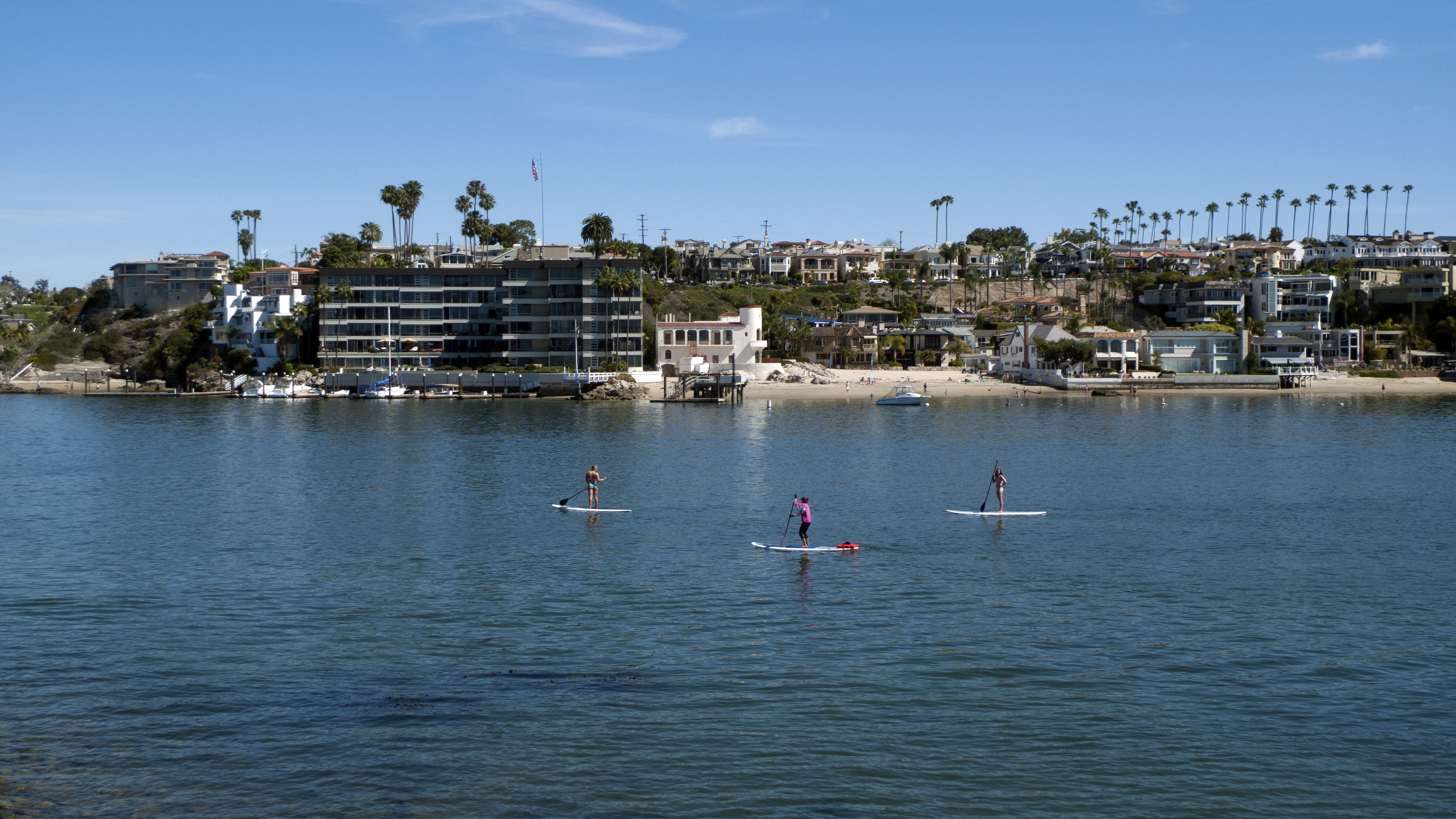
Balboa Peninsula

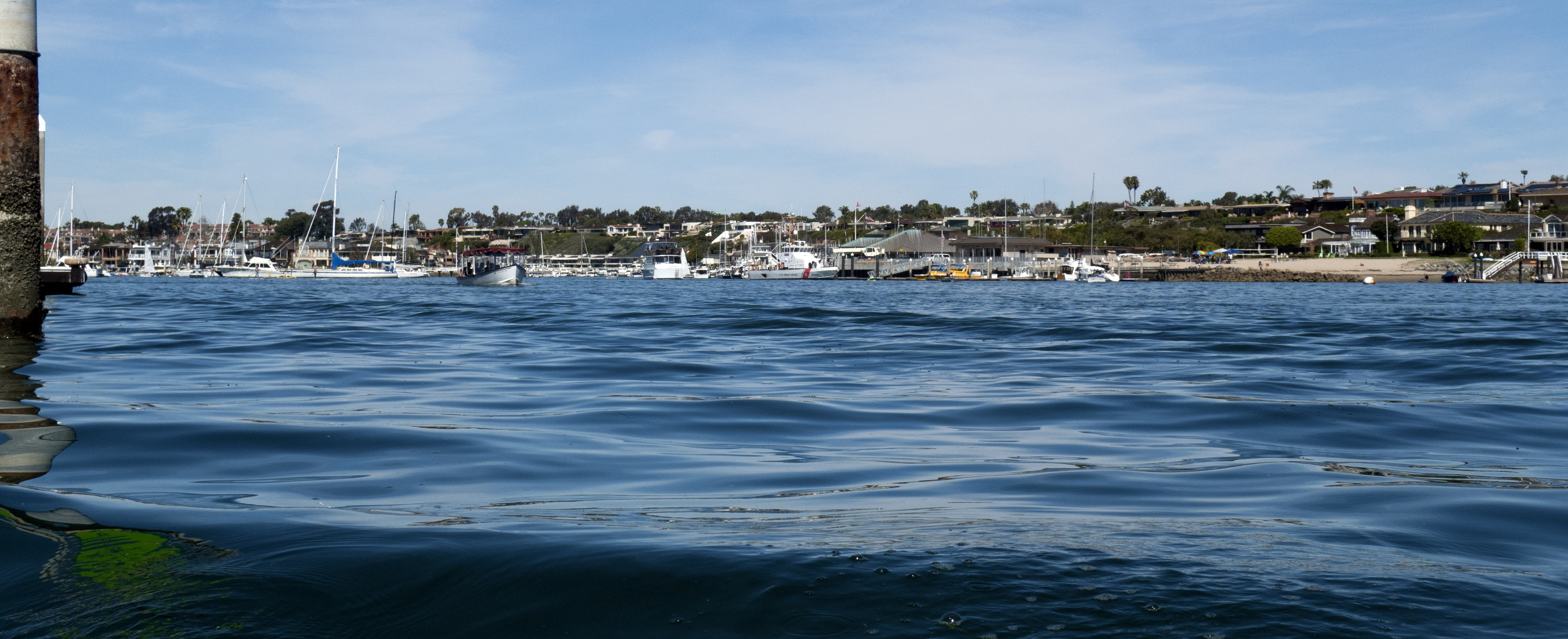
Balboa Peninsula

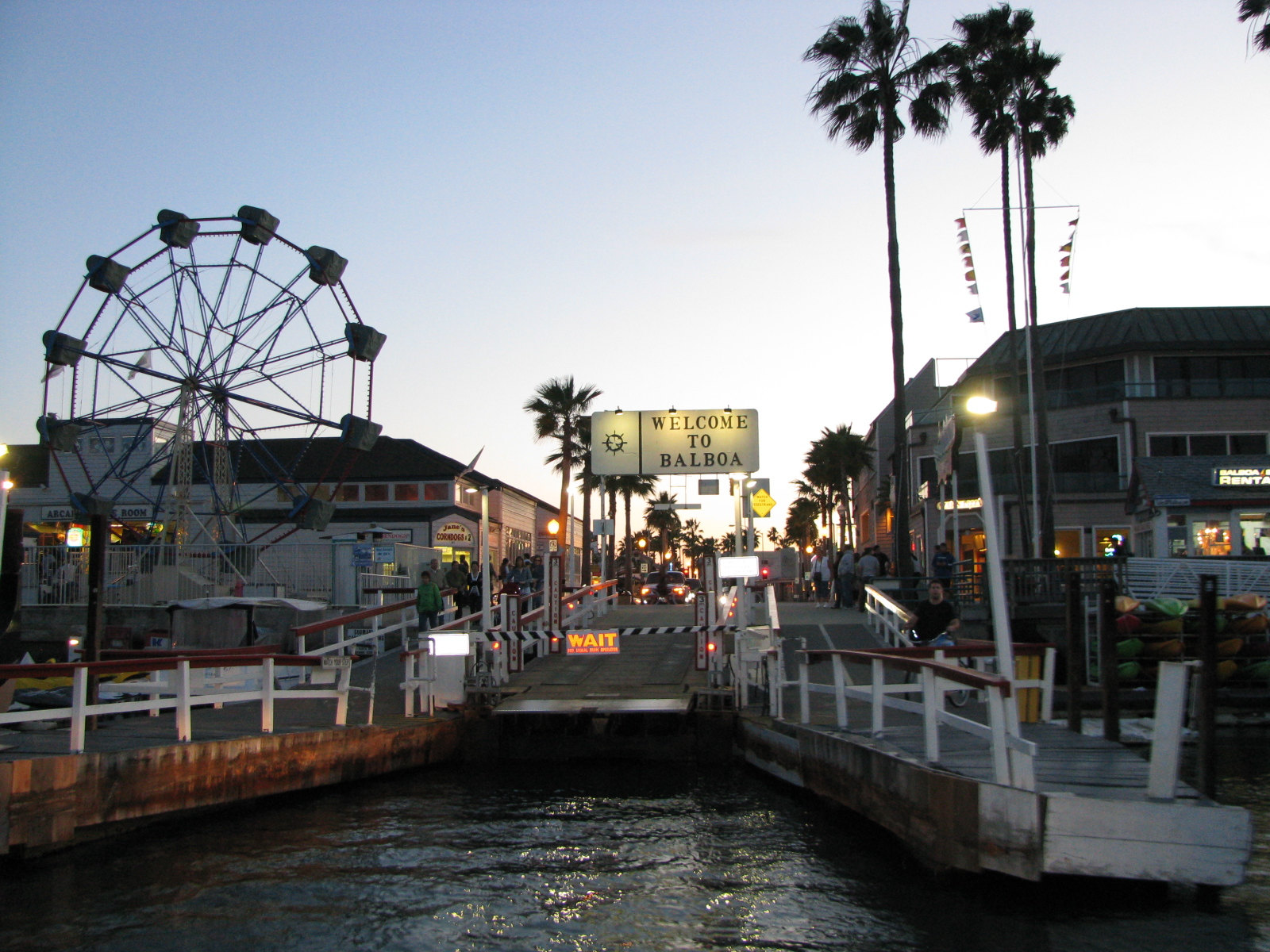
Balboa Island Ferry Terminal on Balboa Peninsula

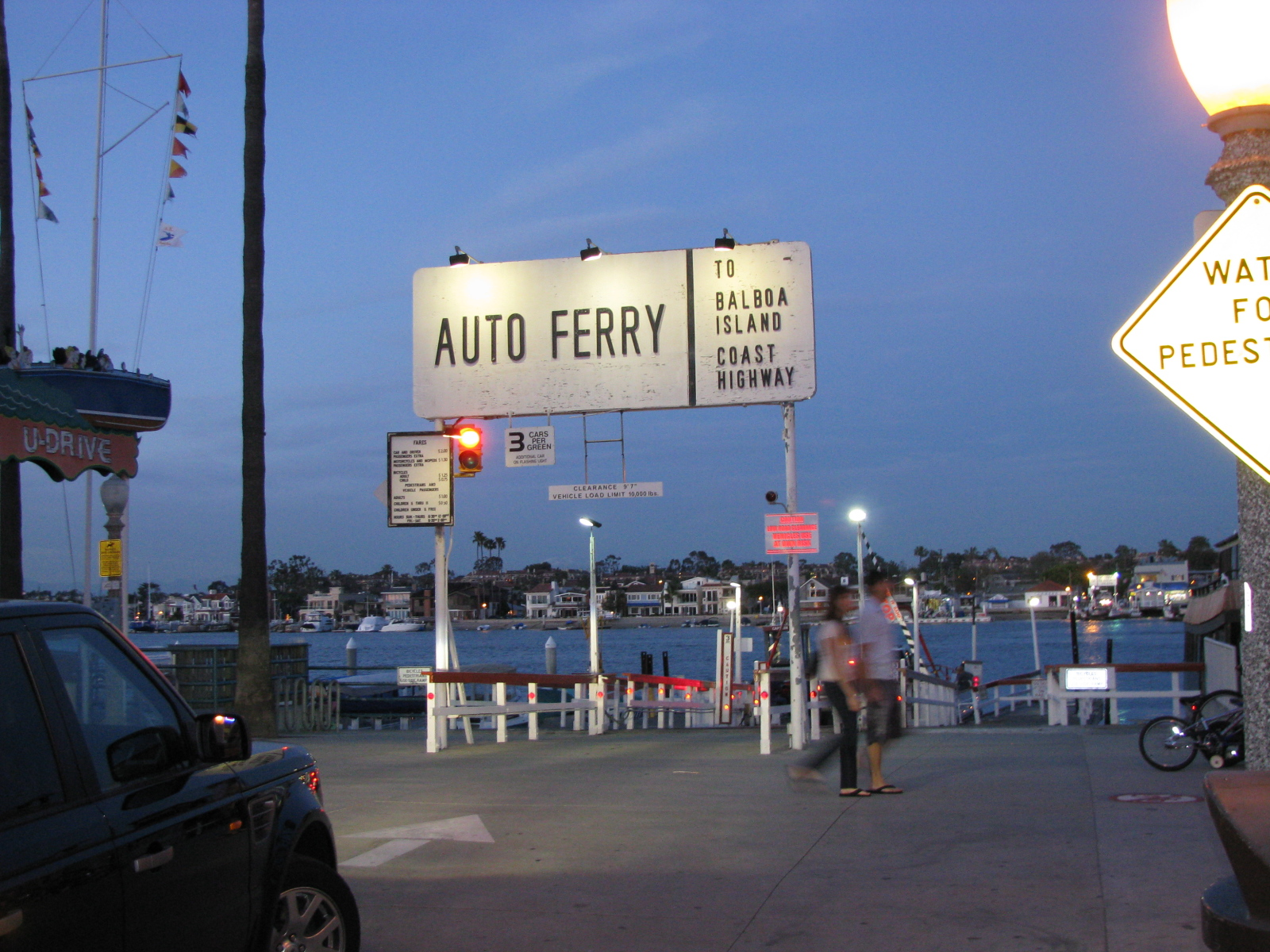
Balboa Island Ferry Terminal on Balboa Peninsula

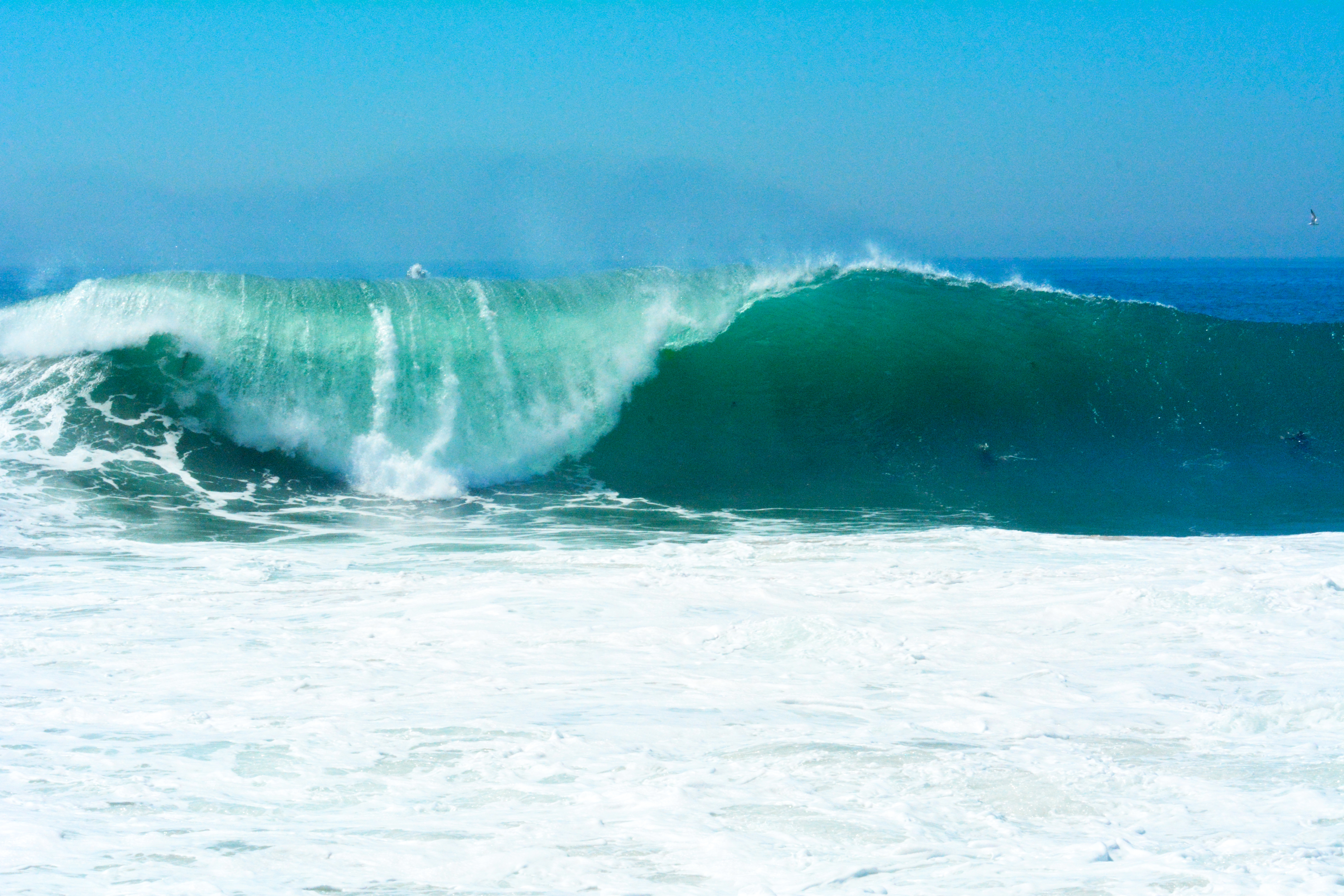
The Wedge: a popular destination for skimboarding, surfing, bodyboarding and bodysurfing is at the end of the Balboa Peninsula, Newport Beach.

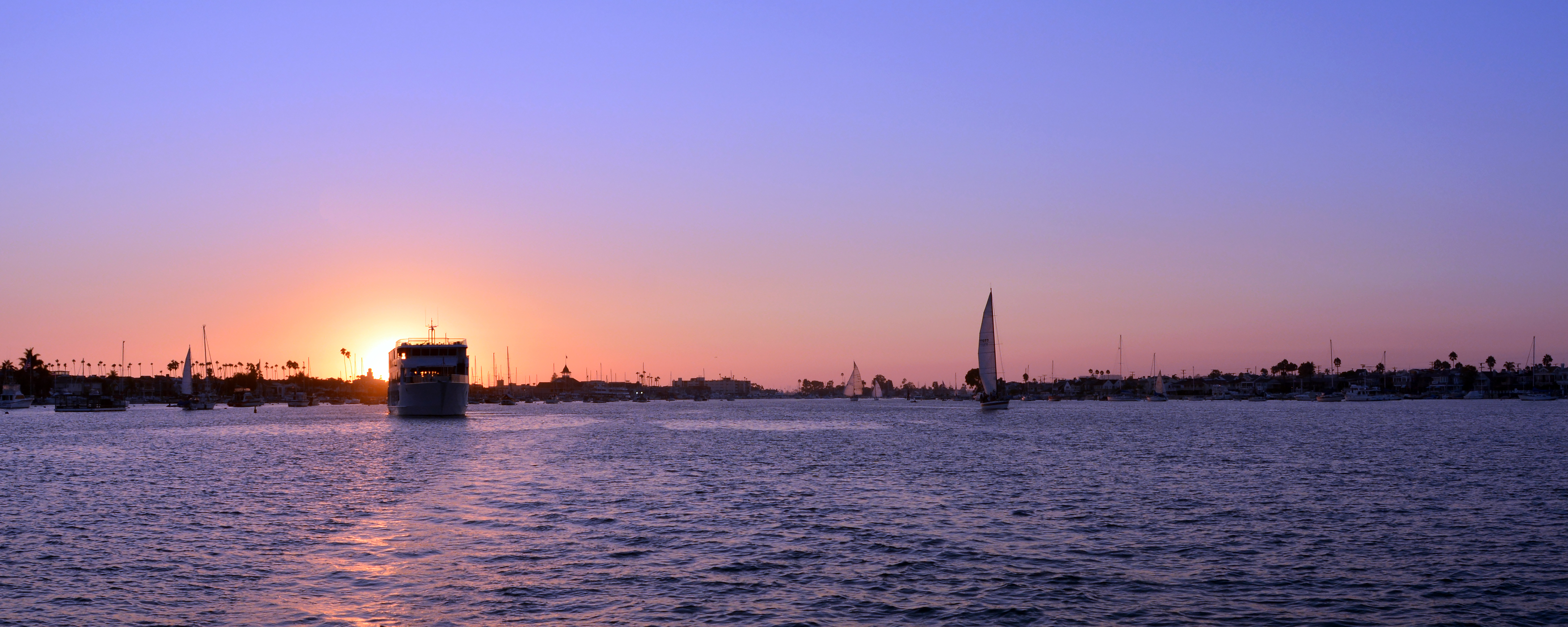
Newport Harbor Sunset

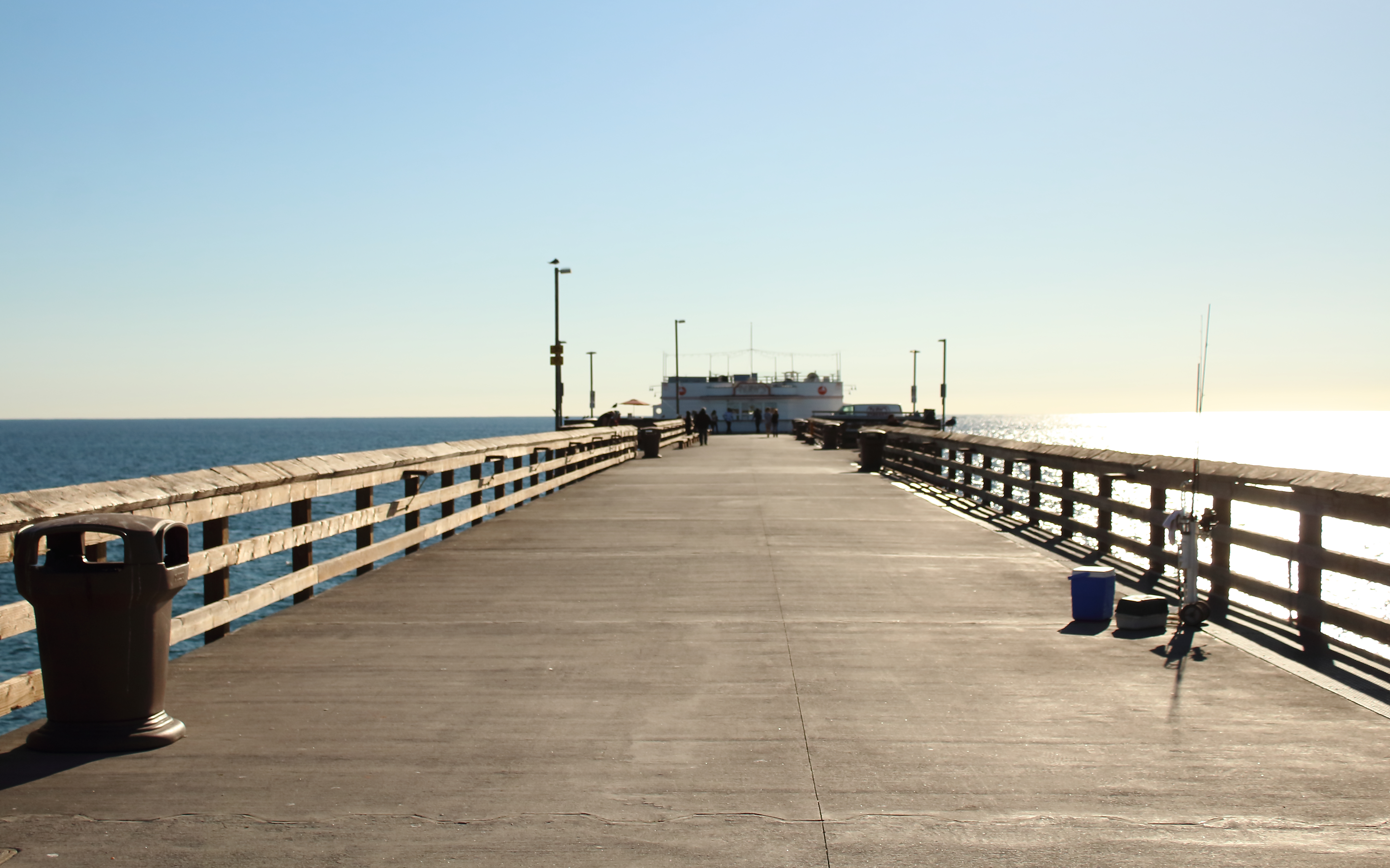
Balboa Pier
