= The Crab Cooker =

Seafood restaurant in Newport Beach, California

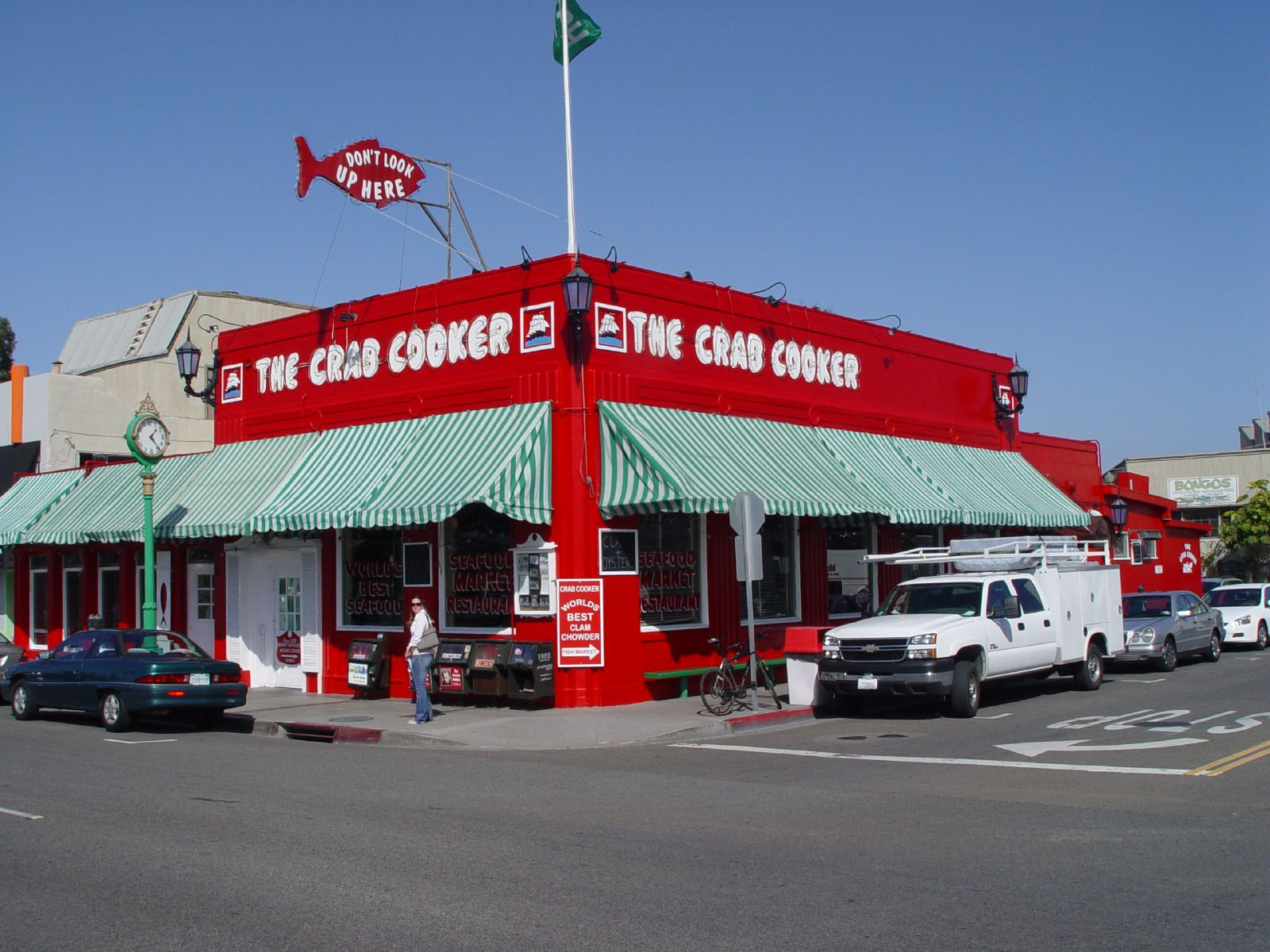
- The original Crab Cooker building as seen from Newport Blvd in 2007
- Interactive map of The Crab Cooker

Restaurant information
- Established: 1951
- Owner: Jim Wasko
- Previous owner: Bob Roubian
- Food type: Seafood Restaurants
- Location: Corner of 22nd & Newport Blvd, Newport Beach, California, 92663, United States
- Coordinates: 33°36′36″N 117°55′41″W
- Reservations: No
- Other locations: Tustin, California (1992)
- Website: www.crabcooker.com

The Crab Cooker is a popular Southern California restaurant specializing in seafood that is located at 22nd Street and Newport Boulevard in Newport Beach on the Balboa Peninsula. In 1969, Venture Magazine rated it as one of the top two restaurants in the world.

The restaurant is known for its Manhattan-style clam chowder, skewers of scallops, crab and lobster entrees, oysters, crab and shrimp cocktail, salmon fillet and other fresh fish.

== History ==
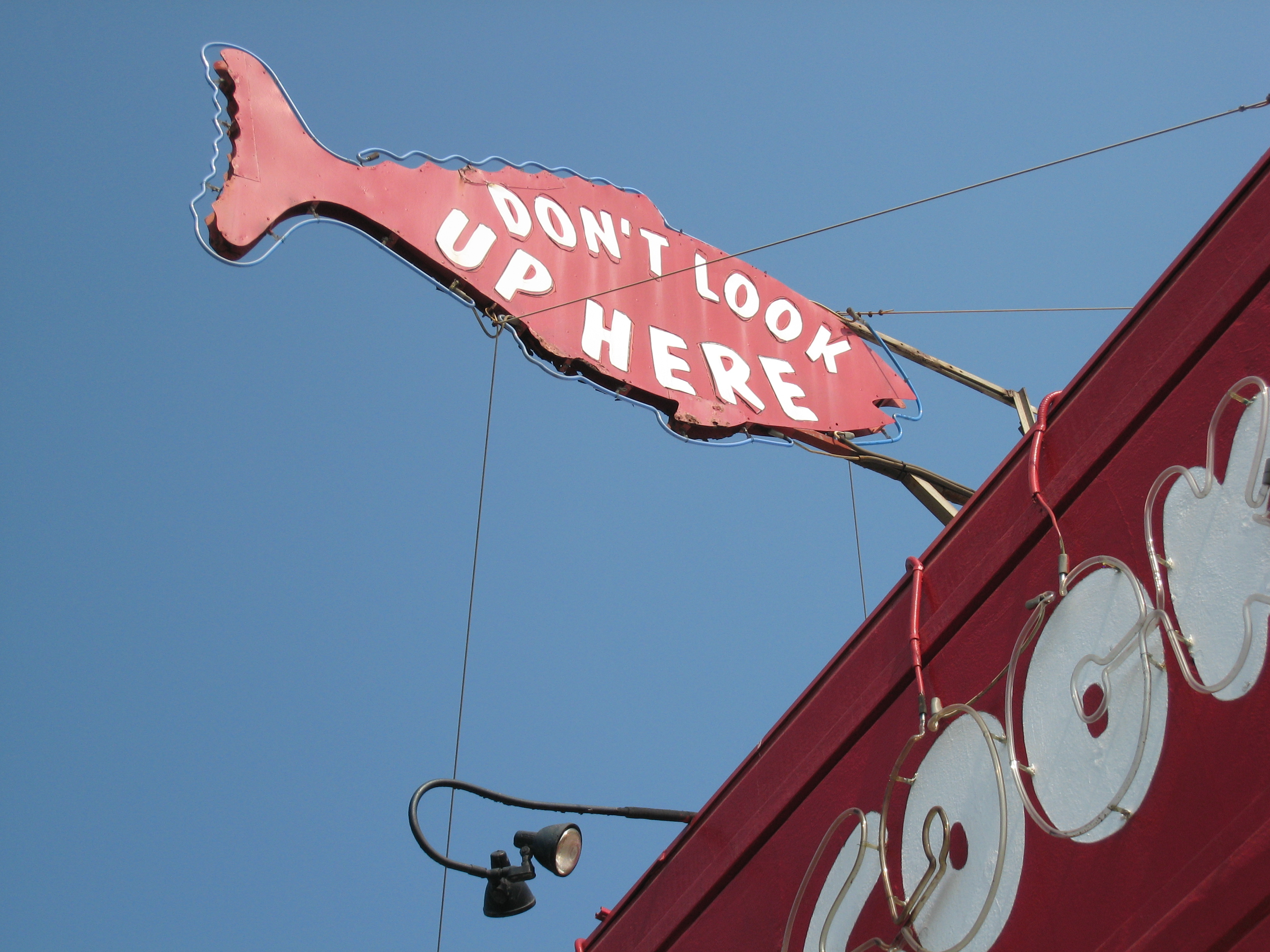
Iconic Fish Sign

The Crab Cooker restaurant was founded at 28th Street and Marina when original owner Bob Roubian was offered the opportunity to take over a local fish market in August 1951. Roubian, a carpenter by trade, had helped remodel the market three years earlier and had an interest in fishing. The original 1,700-square-foot (158 m^{2}) restaurant was adjoined by a 9,000-square-foot (836 m^{2}) annex. The building housing the restaurant was formerly a branch of the Bank of America, whose former logo can be seen embedded in the corner of the building. The restaurant was established in 1951 and is considered a local landmark. In 1992, a second restaurant was opened in Tustin, California.

Bob Roubian, who was born in Pasadena, served as a Seabee during the Second World War. In 1955, Roubian and Cliffie Stone wrote a rockabilly song called "The Popcorn Song", proceeds from which helped pay off the restaurant's debts. Roubian died in 2017 and the restaurants are now managed by his son-in-law.

=== Temporary closure ===
In 2019, The Crab Cooker's original location in Newport Beach was demolished after construction of an adjacent condominium complex undermined the restaurant's foundations, causing major structural damage that resulted in the business's insurers declaring the building to be "unsalvageable." The building's owners decided to demolish it and rebuild on the current site. The last day of business in the original building was September 2, 2018. Construction problems delayed rebuilding by more than a year.

In 2021, the new building opened, retaining many of the features and whimsy of the original building, including the iconic fish sign that says, "Don't look up here!".

== Description ==
The Crab Cooker restaurant is known for its casual atmosphere. The building's exterior is painted bright red. Inside, the restaurant decoration is a pastiche of unique items including paintings by famous artists, theater chandeliers, pots and pans, a wrought-iron gate, nautical equipment and a giant shark. the restaurant is popular with locals and tourists from around the world. Food is served on paper plates.

It is common to see patrons waiting in lines in the street; these lines once elevated The Crab Cooker to national headlines when advance staff for President Richard Nixon asked Roubian to allow Nixon to be seated for dinner. Roubian informed them the president would have to wait along with rest of the people, as would any president.

== In popular culture ==
In the television show The O.C., the restaurant dubbed the "Crab Shack" is The Crab Cooker. but, in one episode, Julie Cooper (Melinda Clarke) refers to the restaurant by its real-life name.

== See also ==
- Balboa Inn
- List of seafood restaurants
