= Ofe Akparata =

- Type: Traditional Nigerian soup
- Place of origin: South East (Nigeria)
- Region or state: Igbo people
- Serving temperature: Warm
- Main ingredients: Fermented mahoganey seed; Palm oil; Vegetable; Fresh pepper; Uziza or Scent leaves
- Ingredients generally used: Cameroon pepper; Oha leaves; Ogiri

Ofe Akparata) is a soup made from Mahogany seed traditional known as Akparata among the Igbo tribe. The soup originates from the Eastern part of Nigeria and it is a favourite dish among the Enugu indigenes. The Mahogany seed is widely used as a thickener used in soups and other dishes, besides using it as a thickener it can also be used in making the sauce used in the preparation of Cowleg or Goatleg Nkwobi and Abacha.

== Overview ==
In many Igbo households, learning to prepare the soup is considered a rite of passage, reflecting its cultural significance and longstanding medicinal value. Its health benefits include supporting digestion, providing antioxidants and essential minerals, and promoting gut health. However, because it can be high in fat depending on the preparation method, it is best consumed in moderation by those monitoring their fat intake. It can be eaten with swallow of choice especially akpu ede (pounded cocoyam).

== Ingredients ==
List

- Chicken
- Onions
- Salt
- Stockfish
- Palm Oil
- Dry Fish
- Fresh Pepper
- Crayfish
- Egusi
- Seasoning
- Cow Skin (Pomo)
- Oha (Pterocarpus mildbraedii)
- Mahogany Seed (Akparata)
- Dry Pepper
