= Terry Wade =

American bodysurfer (born 1960)

Terry Wade (born February 27, 1960) is an American bodysurfer. Terry Wade, who began surfing at the Wedge at age 14, describes it as an exceptionally high-performance wave, noted for its challenge and intensity, making it one of the most formidable waves worldwide due to its power and steepness.

== Career ==
Wade rode the large waves at The Wedge, a surf spot in Newport Beach, California. He received significant media coverage between 1973 and 1998, for sitting in the water for hours waiting for the largest waves of the day. He was described by Details magazine as the "Michael Jordan of big wave bodysurfing".

Wade was among those who fought Newport Beach City Council to keep surf and body boards out of The Wedge during certain times of the day during a specified time of the year, for safety reason. He has also opposed big name surfers bringing large crews of photographers for photo opportunities at The Wedge, and gave an open invitation to all to bodysurf The Wedge.

== Media appearances ==
Wade has been profiled in many surf magazines, and has appeared in surf films including Thump, Bud Brown's Goin Surfin', Wavemasters, Five Summer Stories, and a documentary by Tom Lynch about The Wedge. For some years after he stopped surfing The Wedge, Wade continued to be interviewed by magazines such as Outside and Details.

In 2016, Wade featured prominently in Dirty Old Wedge, a documentary about the history of The Wedge, and was described as the "superstar" of The Wedge Crew.

== Injuries ==
Terry Wade's dominance in the surf scene of the 1980s was curtailed due to a succession of injuries incurred in pursuit of riding formidable waves. His involvement in surfing, particularly at the Wedge, concluded after a series of severe injuries. At 19, a significant fall resulted in injury, and a decade later another incident necessitated assistance to exit the water. He withdrew from the sport in 1998, having undergone spinal surgery. Presently, Wade resides in Bakersfield, where he teaches flying, scheduling lessons around the management of his ongoing pain.

== Personal life ==
Terry has been with his wife, Mellissa, since 1991. They were married in Maui, Hawaii, in 1993.

Like many surfers at The Wedge, Wade has suffered serious health consequences in relation to the sport, including a broken back, a broken nose, ribs, a torn rotator cuff, melanoma and non-Hodgkin's lymphoma.
