= Leete, Nevada =

- Ghost town
- Location within Nevada Location within the United States
- Country: United States
- State: Nevada
- County: Churchill
- Elevation: 4,039 ft (1,231 m)

Leete is a ghost town in Churchill County, in the U.S. state of Nevada. A variant name was "Eagle Salt Works".

The community was named after B. F. Leete, who established the Eagle Salt Works at the site.

In the early 1910s, Leete had a population of about 20.

The Eagle Salt Works Post Office was in operation from July 1871 until Sept 1871 and from June 1877 until December 1899. In December 1899, the name was changed to the Leete Post Office, which closed in January 1912.
