= Newport Pier =

Ocean pier in Newport Beach, California

Coordinates: 33°36′26.38″N 117°55′44.19″W

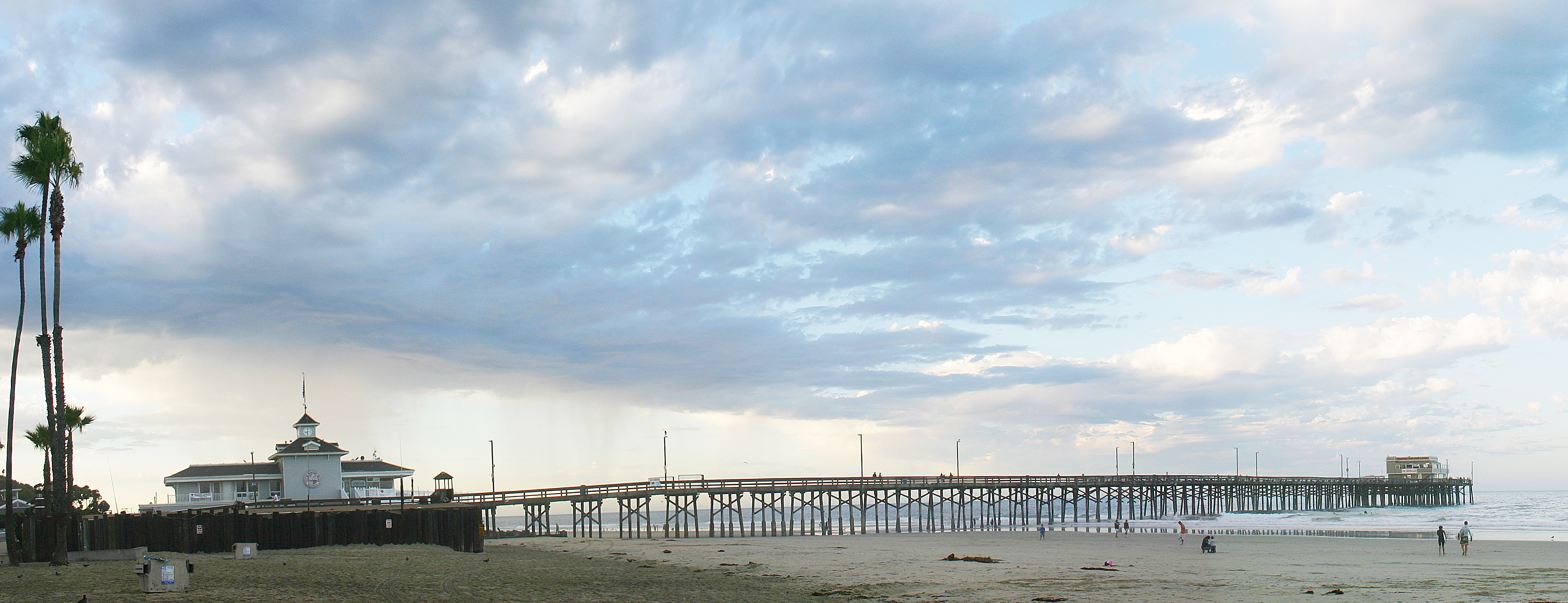
View of the Newport Municipal Pier from the beach at dawn.

The Newport Pier is one of two municipal piers in the city of Newport Beach, California. The pier replaced the McFadden Wharf (1888-1939) and the site is registered as California Historical Landmark number 794. It is 1,032 feet (314.6 m) long, built to a water depth of 25 feet. The other ocean pier on the Balboa Peninsula is the Balboa Pier.

== McFadden Wharf ==
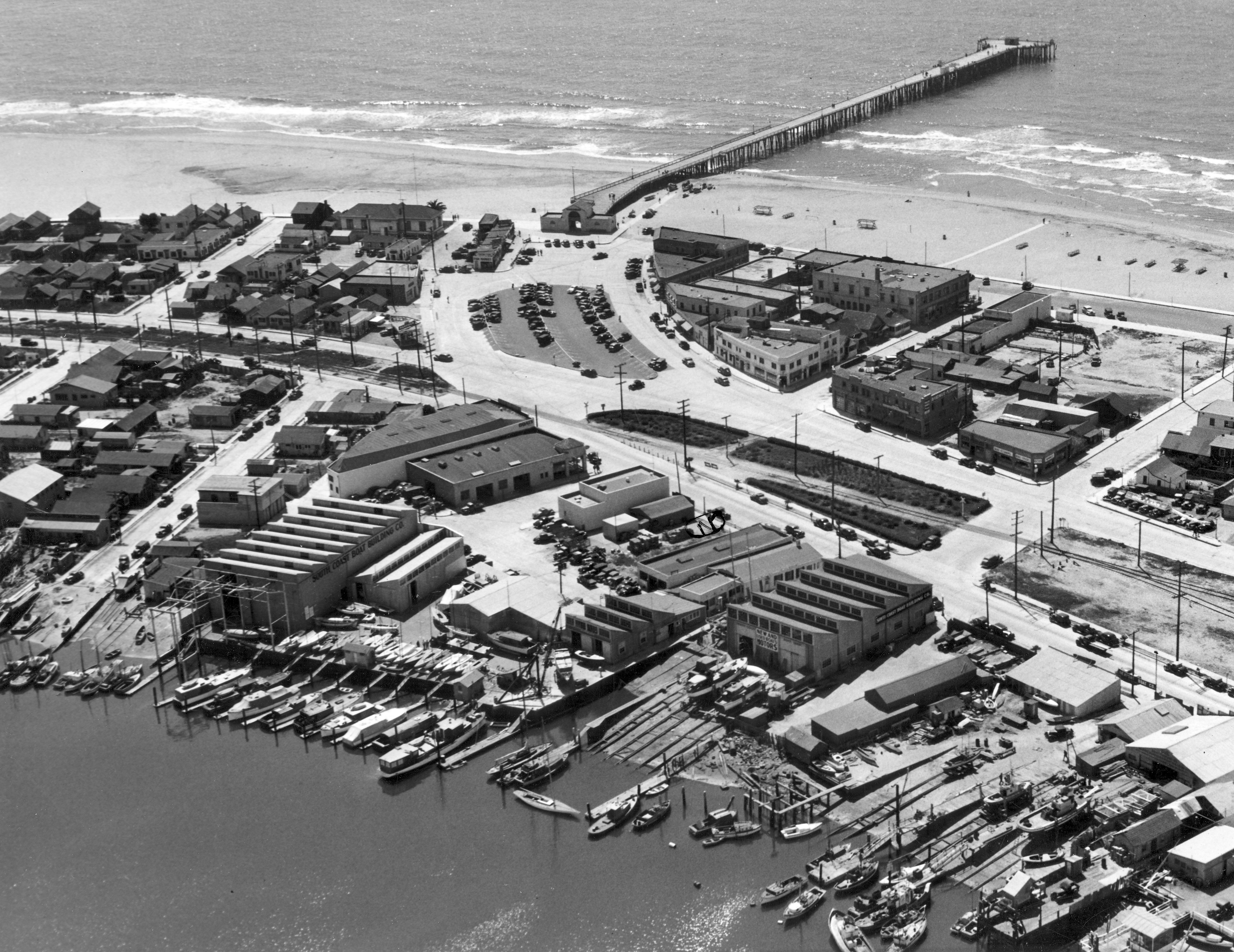
Aerial view of the Newport Municipal Pier at Newport Beach, California in the 1940s

The original pier was known as McFadden Wharf when it was completed in the summer of 1888 by local landowners James and Robert McFadden. The wharf served as a shipping connection for the McFaddens to offload lumber, hides and other merchandise. In 1890, they connected it to the Santa Ana and Newport Railway for commercial transport into Orange, San Bernardino, and Riverside Counties. The McFaddens sold the site in 1902 to W.S. Collins, who began to transform the area for residential and recreational use. The expansion of the Los Angeles passenger railway system to the wharf in 1905 catalyzed the development of the city of Newport Beach as a tourist destination.

In 1922, the pier was remodeled by the City of Newport and remained a shipping terminus until 1939 when it was destroyed in a hurricane.

== Newport Municipal Pier ==
The current pier was reconstructed on the same site in 1940. Located at Oceanfront Boulevard and 21st Place, it is popular for angling, strolling and dining. At the end of the pier sits a restaurant called the "Newport Pier Grill and Sushi." The restaurant has an outdoor patio called the William Wright Terrace, which adds 288 square feet (26.8 m^{2}) and can seat up to 28 with a view of the water. The Newport Pier Grill and Sushi has been closed since 2012. It has since been deconstructed. At the base of the pier is the Dory Fishing Fleet, a beachside fishing cooperative founded in 1891. Also at the base of the pier is the headquarters of the city fire department's Lifeguard division.

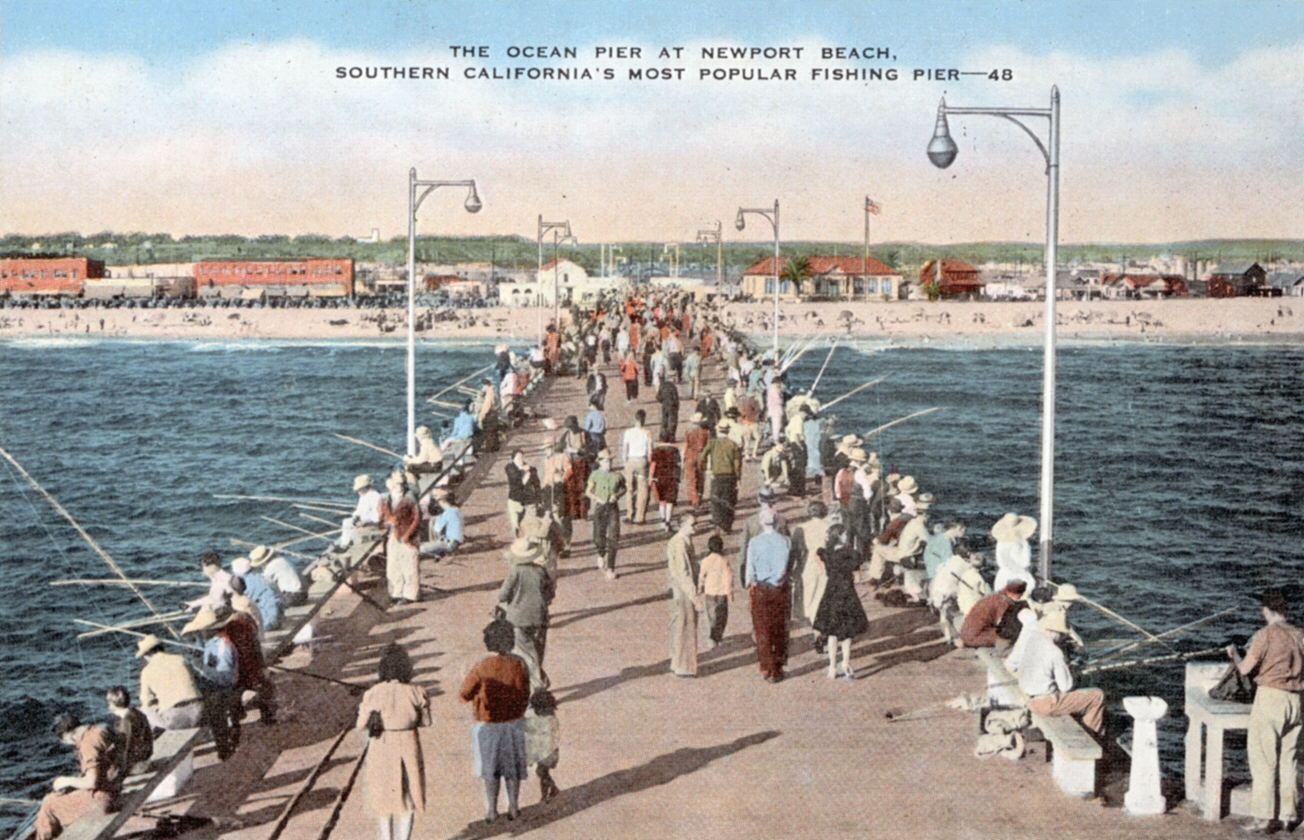
Postcard of the Newport Municipal Pier

Life Guard Headquarters

Life Guard Headquarters

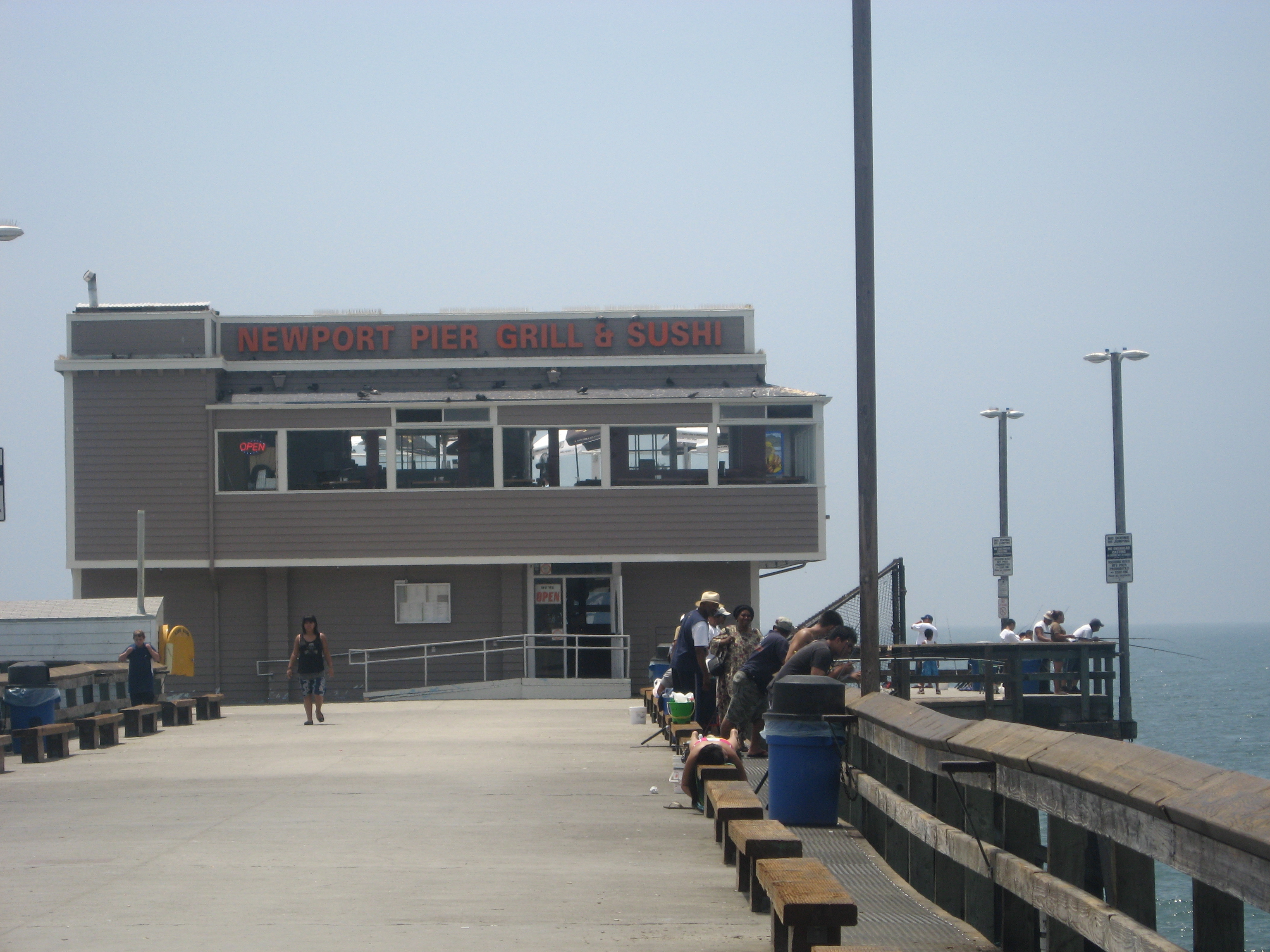
Newport Pier Grill and Sushi, Newport Beach, CA

Dory Fleet, Newport Beach, CA

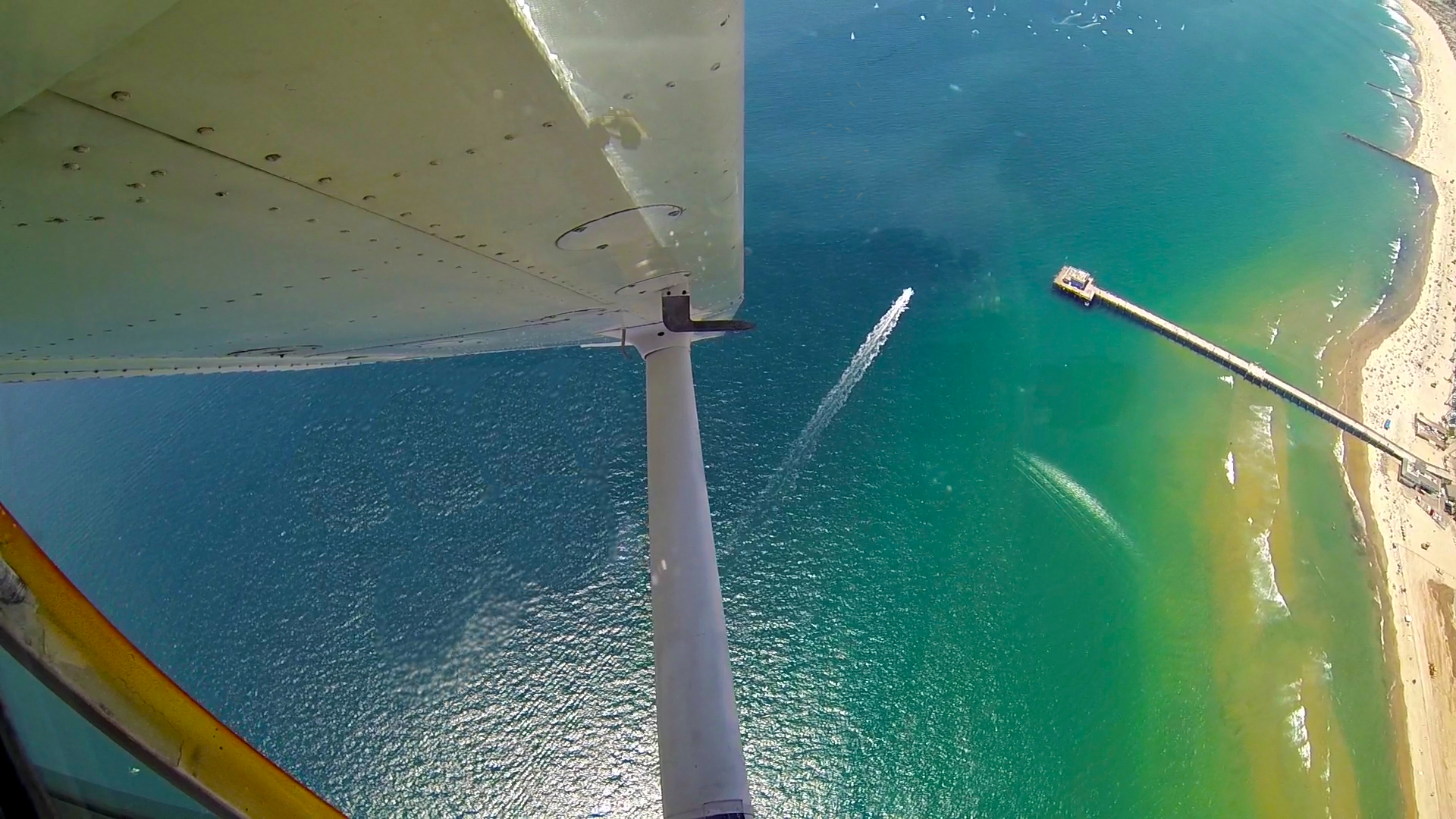
Newport Beach Pier Aerial

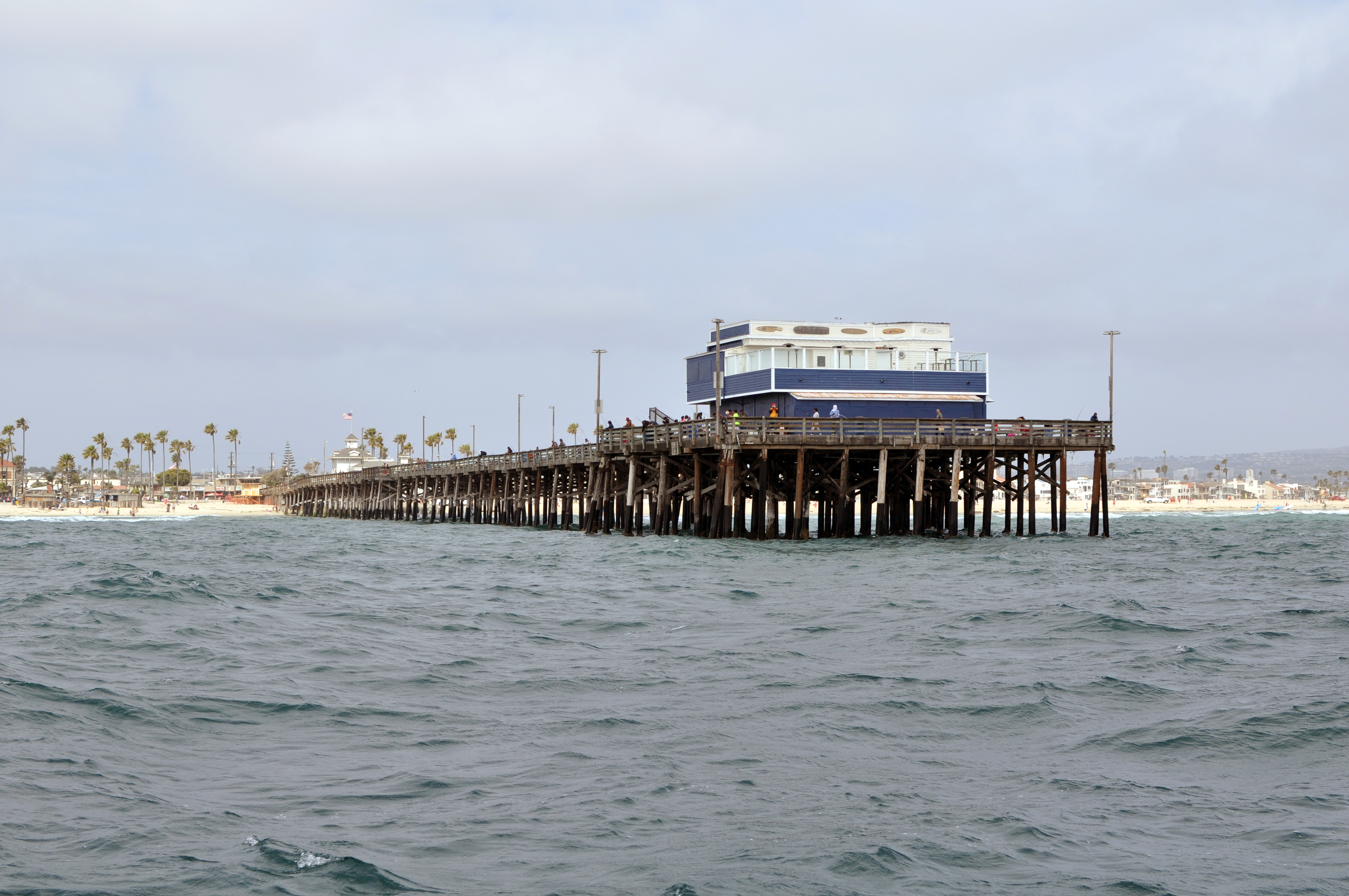
Newport Beach Pier
