= The Wedge (surfing) =

Surfing location

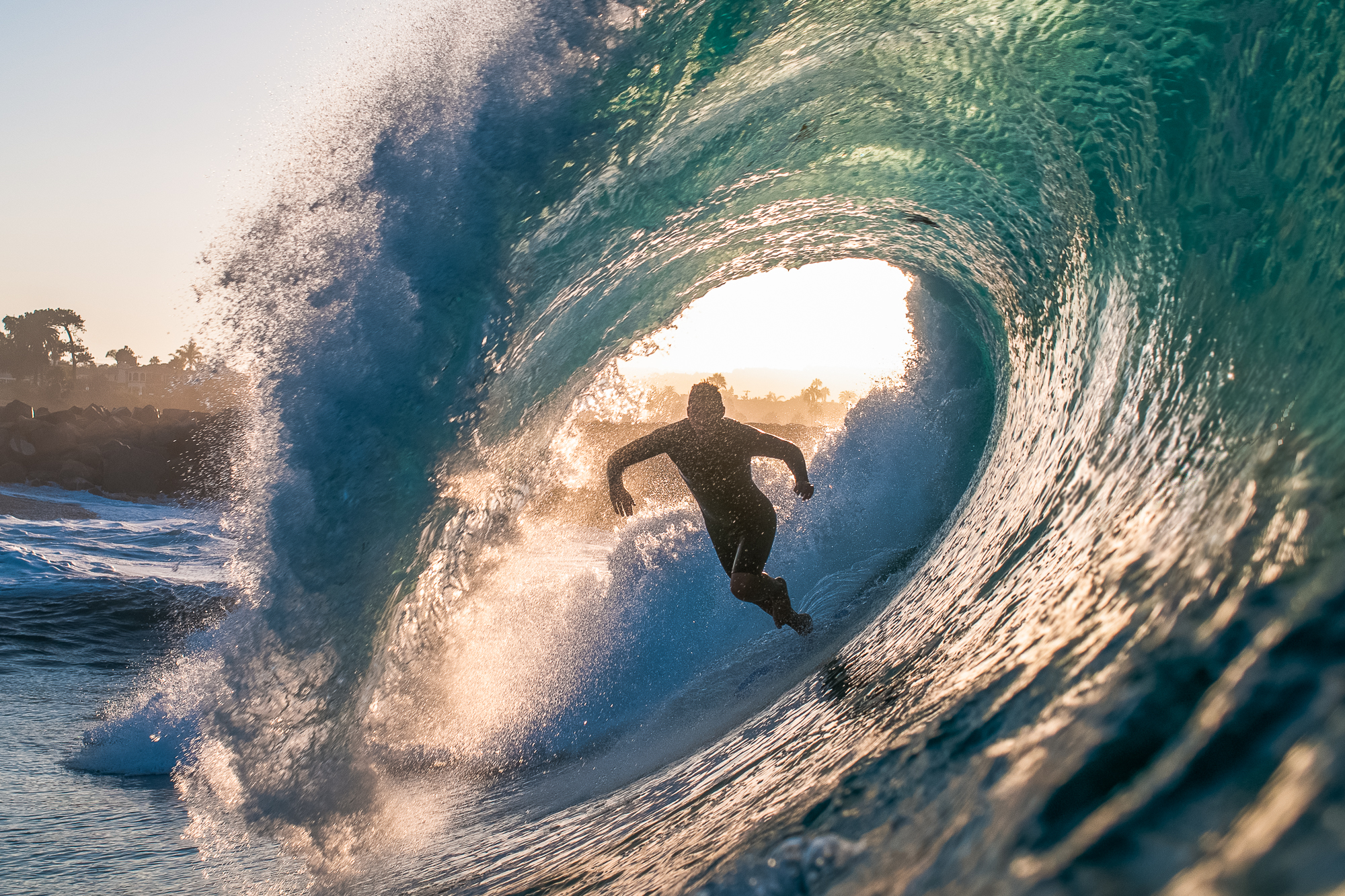
- The surf at "The Wedge".

Details
- Location: Newport Beach, California
- Coordinates: 33°35′33″N 117°52′56″W

The Wedge is a renowned surf break located at the southeastern tip of the Balboa Peninsula in Newport Beach, California. It is famous for its massive and unpredictable waves that can reach up to 30 feet (9.1 m) in height, generated by the interaction between incoming swell and the rock jetty built by the U.S. Army Corps of Engineers in the 1930s. These waves form through a phenomenon known as wave reflection or interference, where incoming waves bounce off the jetty and collide with subsequent waves, amplifying their energy. These mechanics create steep shore-breaking waves capable of launching riders into the air or slamming them into shallow sand – making The Wedge both a world-class bodysurfing destination and one of the most dangerous breaks in California.

== The waves ==
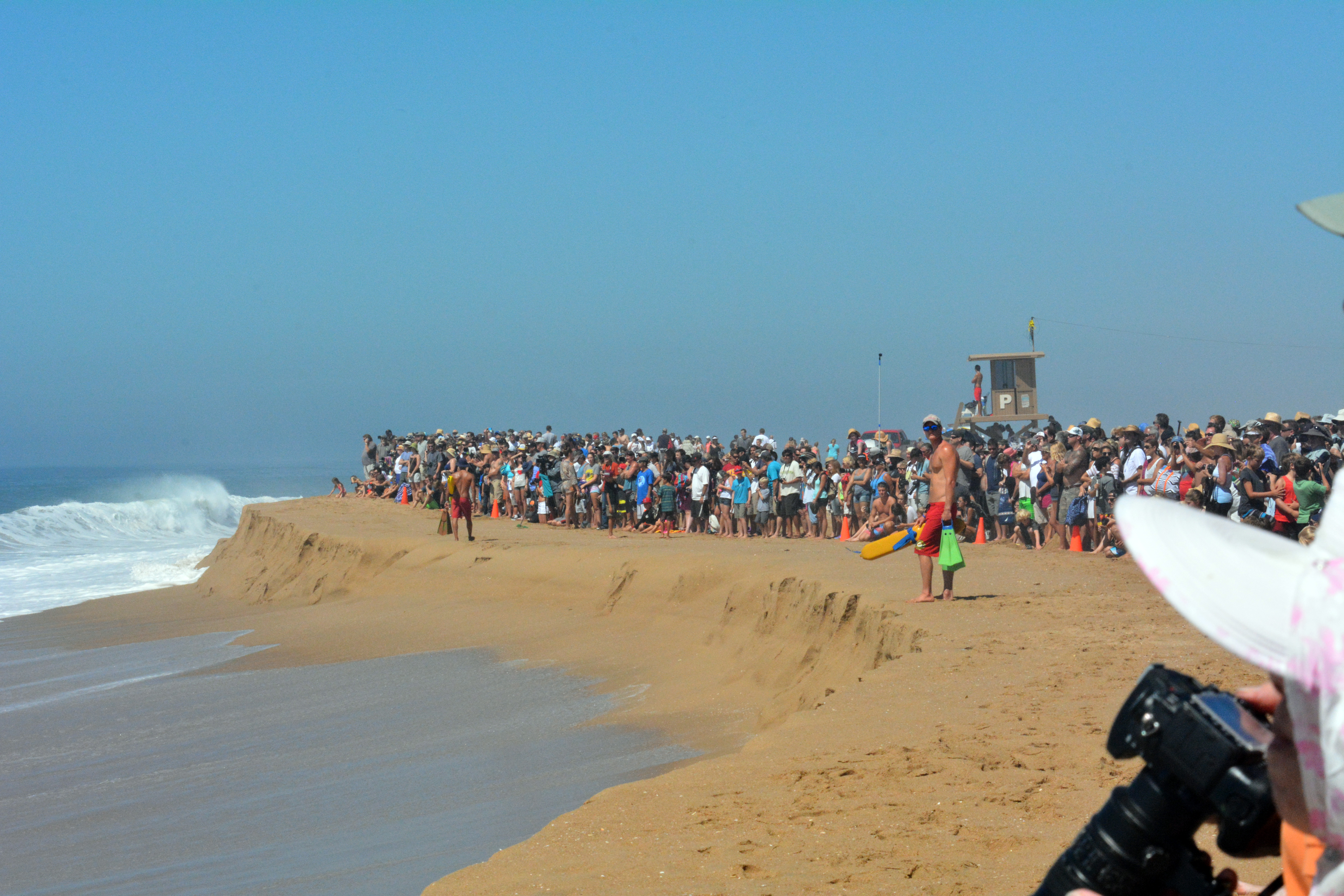
Crowds gather to watch giant waves at the Wedge, Newport Beach

The massive, unpredictable waves at The Wedge are the result of a phenomenon known as wave reflection. When a south or southwest swell hits the 2,000-foot (610 m) jetty constructed by the U.S. Army Corps of Engineers in the 1930s, part of the energy reflects off the rocks and merges with subsequent incoming waves. This merging of swells, known as constructive interference, creates a new wave that is larger, steeper, and more powerful than either original wave on its own. This process results in peaks that can reach 30 feet (9.1 m) in height and break just yards from shore. The shape of the steep beach adds to the danger by creating a violent shore break and a strong backwash that pulls surfers and swimmers back into the surf, sometimes colliding with new incoming waves. Because of these combined factors, no two waves at The Wedge are ever the same, making it a uniquely chaotic and challenging environment—even for experienced surfers.

== History ==
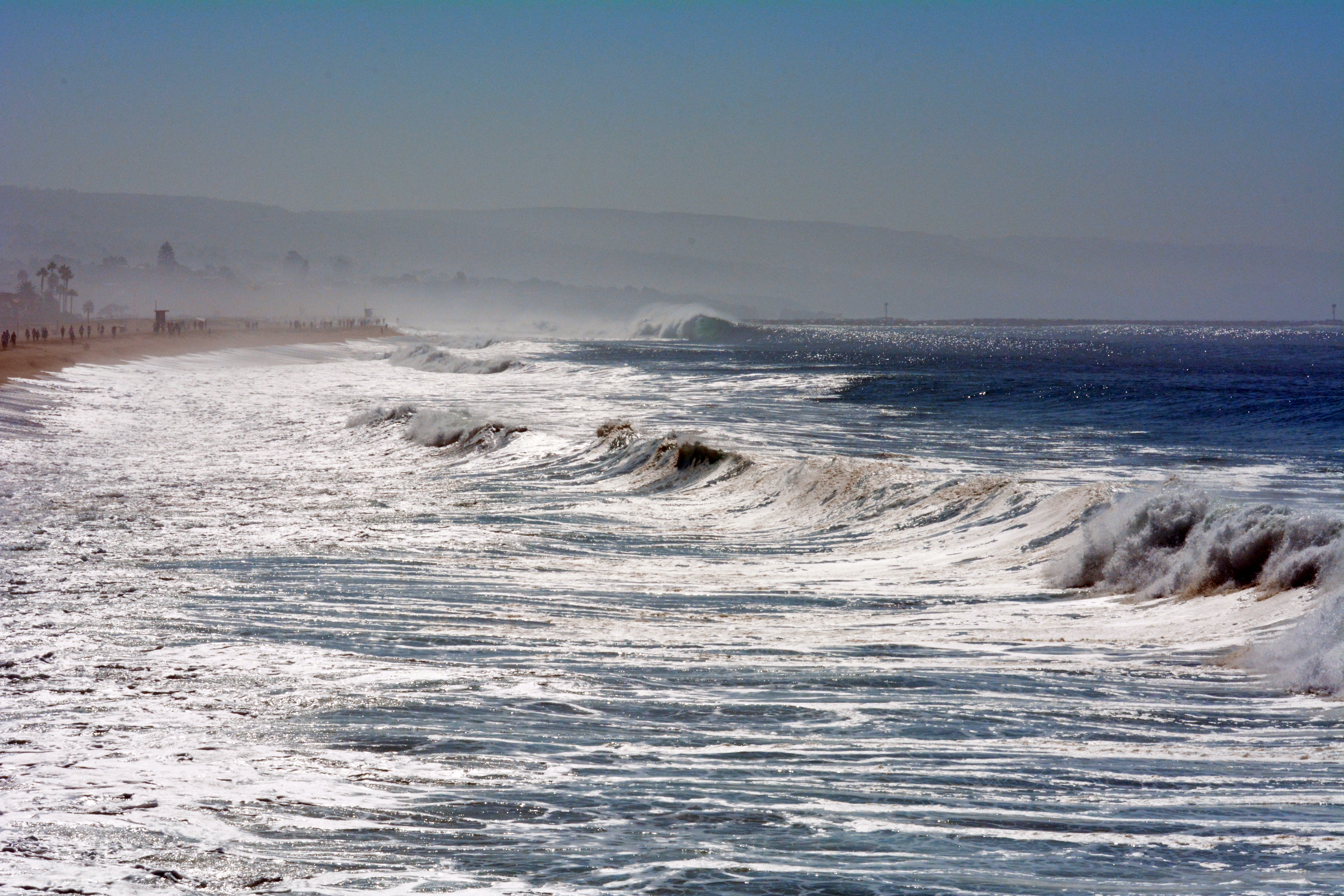
The Wedge (background)

The Wedge owes its creation to a series of harbor modifications driven by tragedy. In 1926, George Rogers Jr., a 15-year-old boy with polio, drowned in Newport Harbor after his boat capsized in the turbulent surf. His iron leg braces, which he relied on due to his illness, caused him to sink and his body was never recovered. Motivated by the loss, his father George Rogers Sr., a successful Southern California road contractor, sold his business and devoted the next decade to lobbying for federal and local funding to improve the harbor's safety.

Through persistent campaigning during the Great Depression, Rogers Sr. helped secure around $2 million in public funding, resulting in the extension and strengthening of the West Jetty. These improvements, completed in 1936, inadvertently created the unique wave conditions that define The Wedge today. Just one month after the harbor's rededication, George Rogers Sr. died of a heart attack while boating through the same harbor entrance where his son had perished ten years prior. Their story was later featured in the 2014 PBS SoCaL documentary The Wedge: Dynasty, Tragedy, Legacy.

== Popular culture ==
Since the 1950s, The Wedge has served as a symbol of Southern California beach culture. During the postwar era, local teens nicknamed the spot “102 Beach,” referencing both the nearby Brew 102 beer and the freewheeling social scene that unfolded during nightly bonfires and parties. The Wedge was later immortalized in Bruce Brown's The Endless Summer, a landmark surf documentary, and it appeared in the opening lyrics of the 1963 teen surf movie Beach Party.

Culturally, the wave has inspired multiple generations of artists. Surf guitarist Dick Dale honored it with a track on his 1963 album Checkered Flag, while modern pop-punk band All Time Low referenced The Wedge in their song “Let It Roll” on the 2007 album So Wrong, It's Right.

Perhaps most famously, Hollywood actor John Wayne experienced a life-changing moment at The Wedge. While bodysurfing the heavy break during his time as a USC football player, Wayne sustained an injury that cost him his athletic scholarship. This unexpected detour ultimately led him to a career in the film industry.

== Injuries and Safety ==
The Wedge has earned a reputation as one of the most dangerous surf breaks in the world, largely due to its abrupt shore break and powerful backwash. Waves can reach speeds of up to 30 miles per hour (48 km/h) before detonating in just a few feet of water. Bodysurfers and swimmers risk severe injuries such as concussions, cervical spine trauma, hip fractures, and near-drownings—incidents so common that Newport Beach lifeguards proactively warn visitors before they even enter the water. In July 2009, a 50-year-old bodysurfer named Monte Kevin Valantin died after being thrown into the jetty by a 20-foot (6.1 m) wave during a high surf advisory. Lifeguards performed a rescue but were unable to save him, marking one of the rare fatalities at a spot that sees frequent injuries. As of 2013, the Encyclopedia of Surfing estimated that The Wedge had caused eight deaths, paralyzed 35 people, and hospitalized thousands more with fractures, dislocations, and muscle damage—more injuries than any other known wave break in the world.

== Notable Surfers and Tourism ==
The Wedge is legendary not only for its waves but for the elite athletes who ride them. Local icons like Terry Wade, Fred Simpson, Mel Thoman, and Tom “Cash Box” Kennedy have defined what it means to master this wave. These bodysurfers have become part of a tight-knit crew known for both their commitment and risk-taking. Simpson, one of the earliest to surf the break in the 1960s, is credited with developing techniques that continue to influence the sport today. Professional surfers such as Jamie O'Brien (Hawaii), Blair Conklin (California), Brad Kuhn (Florida), and Brandon Clarke (Canada) have all challenged The Wedge, appearing in competitions and videos that have boosted the spot's international renown. Tourism flourishes alongside the surf. Spectators line the beach to witness the spectacle, especially during summer swells. Red Bull, the World Surf League, and countless videographers have turned The Wedge into a media event, drawing thousands of visitors during peak swell windows. Visitors often extend their stay by exploring nearby attractions like the Balboa Fun Zone, Newport Pier, and the historic Balboa Pavilion.

== Gallery ==
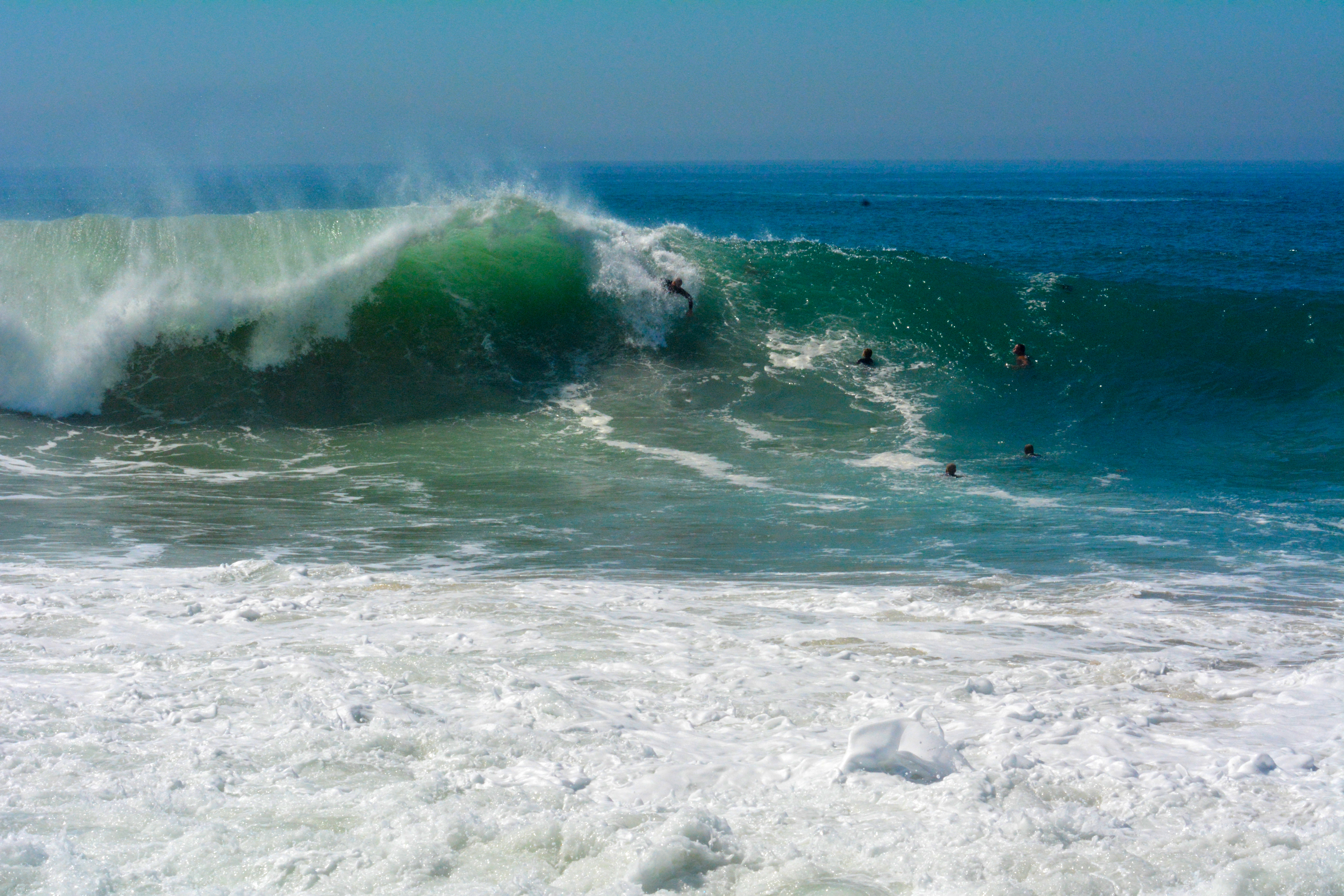
Body surfing large waves at the Wedge

Wedge video, shot during Hurricane Marie
