= Eagle Salt Works Railroad =

Overview
- Headquarters: Unknown
- Locale: Near Fernley, Nevada - Eagle Salt Works
- Dates of operation: 1903–1916

Technical
- Track gauge: 4 ft 8 1/2 in (1,435 mm) standard gauge

The Eagle Salt Works Railroad was a 13.5 mile shortline railroad that ran northeast from a connection with the Southern Pacific Company at Luva (near Fernley) to Leete, Nevada. The line then branched from the old Central Pacific grade and went southeast for about 2 miles to the Eagle Salt Works.

The railroad was incorporated on February 16, 1903. The track was built over the original Central Pacific transcontintinental railway grade that had been abandoned as the CP relocated its mainline in 1903.

Salt demand from the works was already in decline when the railroad opened in 1903. The first train to carry salt did not operate until March 1906. From 1906 to 1910 railroad had very little activity on the line. In 1910, the Southern Pacific Company (SP), which loaned $23,535 to Leete for the railroad, acquired Leete's railroad and salt works due to Leete's default on the loan. Under the Southern Pacific the railroad continued to see little traffic on the line, consisting of salt, coal and hay. The SP abandoned the railroad in March 1916 and the track was removed in April.

== Eagle Salt Works ==
The Eagle Salt Works Railroad was built to haul salt to the Nevada silver mills. B.F. Leete, a surveyor on the Central Pacific Railroad, discovered the hot springs 15 miles east of Wadsworth up the Hot Springs grade in 1869. He recognized that salt was a needed mineral in the reduction of Comstock Lode silver ore, which was in high demand at that time.

The hot springs contained 30% salt and when evaporated provided salt crystals ready for harvest and ready for shipment.

In 1871, Leete's Eagle Salt Works began furnishing salt to the Nevada silver mills. In his first year, he furnished about 3,000 tons of salt. The salt production peaked between 1879 and 1884, was steady until 1902, and declined until 1915, when the works were closed. Total production was 500,000 tons.

Leete shipped the salt via the Central Pacific Railroad as the CP operated near his Salt Works. However, in 1903 the Central Pacific relocated its mainline between Wadsworth - Toy (near milepost 325; east of Lovelock, NV) in favor of a route to the south that goes through Fernley and Hazen to avoid the grade over White Plains Hill. This relocation would leave Leete without a railroad to ship his salt. In August 1902, Leete negotiated with the Central Pacific that when they relocated and removed the tracks, that they leave every other tie in place from Leete (Milepost 294.5) to just east of Wadsworth. Leete proposed to build a light railroad using the old CP grade to a connection with the CP at Wadsworth.

== Construction of the line ==
On February 16, 1903, the Eagle Salt Works Railway was created. Leete built about a mile of track from Luva north to Thisbe (old) at Central Pacific's Milepost 282.37. From Thisbe his railroad ran northeast to Leete along the original/abandoned route of the Central Pacific mainline. At Leete he built a branch off the old CP grade that went two miles to his salt works. In June 1903 the 14.5 mile line was completed.

== Locomotive ==
The Eagle Salt Works Railroad's engine #3 was a "Three Spot" coal-fired 0-4-0T locomotive that was built by Rhode Island Locomotive Works. The locomotive was formerly engine #1 on the Los Angeles Ostrich Farm Railway and its successor in 1887, the Los Angeles County Railroad. The locomotive was then sold to the Santa Ana and Newport Railway until 1903. In 1903 it was sold to Eagle Salt Works after being overhauled at the Central Pacific locomotive shops in Sacramento. In March 1903 it went to work on the Eagle Salt Works to assist in constructing the line.

== Connection with the Central Pacific Railroad ==
- Luva (2 miles east of Fernley, Nevada)

== Route ==
- Luva (near Fernley)
- Thisbe
- Desert
- Leete
- Eagle Salt Works

== Eagle Salt Works (locale) ==
Eagle Salt Works appears as a Churchill County, Nevada place and had a post office in 1871 and then again from 1877 - 1899. In 1899 the post office was transferred to Leete . In 1895 it had a population of 18 people.

- GPS Coordinates Latitude: 39.73167 : Longitude: -119.03694 : Elevation: 4039 ft

== See also ==
- List of defunct Nevada railroads
