= McFadden Wharf =

California historic landmark

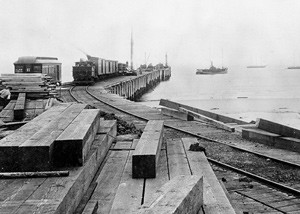
- McFadden Wharf in 1891

- Location within California
- 33°36′28″N 117°55′43″W
- Location: near Newport Bay, California

History
- Built: 1888

California Historical Landmark
- Designated: July 3, 1964
- Reference no.: 794

Old Landing
- Location: near Newport Bay

History
- Built: 1870

California Historical Landmark
- Designated: June 20, 1935
- Reference no.: 198

The place of McFadden Wharf was designated a California Historic Landmark (No.794) on July 3, 1964.

McFadden Wharf was built in what is today Newport Beach, California, Orange County in 1888. The McFadden Wharf was located at the site of the current Newport Pier. Under Mexican rule the port in Newport was called San Joaquin Bay. Brothers from Delhi, New York James McFadden and Robert McFadden came to California and purchased land. On April 19, 1875, they bought 20 acres of land that was part of the former Mexican land grant of José Antonio Yorba. The land was on the coast of the Rancho Santiago de Santa Ana. In 1854, the Yorba family sold Rancho Santiago de Santa Ana to José Antonio Andrés Sepúlveda. Sepúlveda later lost the land due to bankruptcy caused by fighting to uphold his land claims in court. In 1869, William Spurgeon and Ward Bradford purchased 74.27 acres (0.3006 km^{2}) of the ranch to form the city of Santa Ana. In 1866 much of the ranch was sold to James Irvine. James Irvine starting ranching on his land and James McFadden used his land for port shipping. The bay was narrow with sand bars, muddy, and not deep, so it was poor for shipping. Thus, James McFadden needed a wharf built out into the bay. With San Pedro port open his port did even poorer. James McFadden asked the U.S. Army Corps of Engineers for help in 1887. They told him it would take $1.2 million to improve the port, and rejected the request. In 1888 the McFadden brothers built their own wharf. The wharf was 1320 feet long and 60 feet wide. In 1891 they built the Santa Ana and Newport Railway railroad line from the wharf to the Santa Ana Depot, 11 miles long. A small town called Newport Landing was built near the Wharf. The McFadden brothers had 100 employees and the shipping company was at last profitable. In 1896 they purchased more land in what is now Newport Beach. But the port of San Pedro was bigger and closer to Los Angeles and shipping decreased. In 1899 James McFadden sold the wharf and railroad line to the Southern Pacific Transportation Company. The rail line closed in 1907. In 1902, James sold the town of Newport Landing, half the Balboa Peninsula, and surrounding swamp lands to Williams S. Collins and C. A. Hanson. Collins, President of the Associated Oil Company, saw the town as a place to make a sea resort, not a shipping port. The team made Henry E. Huntington a partner in the Newport Beach development. In 1905, the Pacific Electric street cars ran to Newport; in 1906 the line continued to Balboa Peninsula and Balboa Pavilion. In 1939 the old McFadden Wharf was removed after being damaged by a large storm in 1928. In 1940 the current Newport Municipal Pier was built.

== Old Landing ==
The place of Old Landing at San Joaquin Bay was designated a California Historic Landmark (No.198) on June 20, 1935. A marker is at the spot that Newport Bay was opened to trade. Captain Samuel S. Dunnells and William A. Abbott opened the port for trade on September 10, 1870. The first ship to enter the bay was the 105-ton, flat-bottomed sternwheel steamer SS Vaquero with cargo of 15,000 shingles and 5,000 feet of lumber from San Diego. Samuel S. Dunnells built a small wharf called the Newport Landing. Newport Landing and Landing Warehouse was near the current Pacific Coast Highway and the Newport Bay Bridge. James McFadden and Robert McFadden purchased land and ran the port from April 19, 1875 until 1899; the McFaddens built a long wharf that opened in 1889. The landing was renamed Newport. The port and farm land around the port was owned by James Irvine, Benjamin Flint, James McFadden, and Robert McFadden.

== Markers ==
Marker at the McFadden Wharf site reads:

- "The original wharf at this site was completed in the winter of 1888–89 and was connected by railroad with the hinterland in the winter of 1890–91. It served as a shipping and distributing point for Orange, San Bernardino, and Riverside counties until 1907, and provided the nucleus from which developed the city of Newport Beach." Erected 1965 by California State Park Commission in cooperation with the City of Newport Beach. (Marker Number 794.)

California Historical Landmarks records for McFadden Wharf reads:

- "No. 794 McFadden Wharf – The original wharf on this site was completed in the summer of 1888 by the McFadden brothers. As the seaward terminus of their Santa Ana and Newport Railway it became the funnel through which flowed a major part of the lumber and other goods that built Orange, San Bernardino, and Riverside Counties during the period from 1891 to 1907."

Marker at the Old Landing, Newport Landing, site reads:

- "On September 10, 1870, Captain Samuel S. Dunnells and William A. Abbott opened Newport Bay to commerce when they entered it for the first time on the Sternwheel steamer Vaquero. The landing was designated "Newport" – a new port – by James Irvine, Benjamin Flint, james McFadden, and Robert McFadden. The McFaddens operated a regular shipping service here during the 1870s and 1880s." Erected 1935 by State Department of Parks and Recreation in cooperation with the Newport Beach Historical Society and City of Newport Beach. (Marker Number 198.)

== See also ==
- California Historical Landmarks in Orange County, California
- Balboa Island, Newport Beach
- Bay Island (California)
