= Skimboarding =

Boardsport

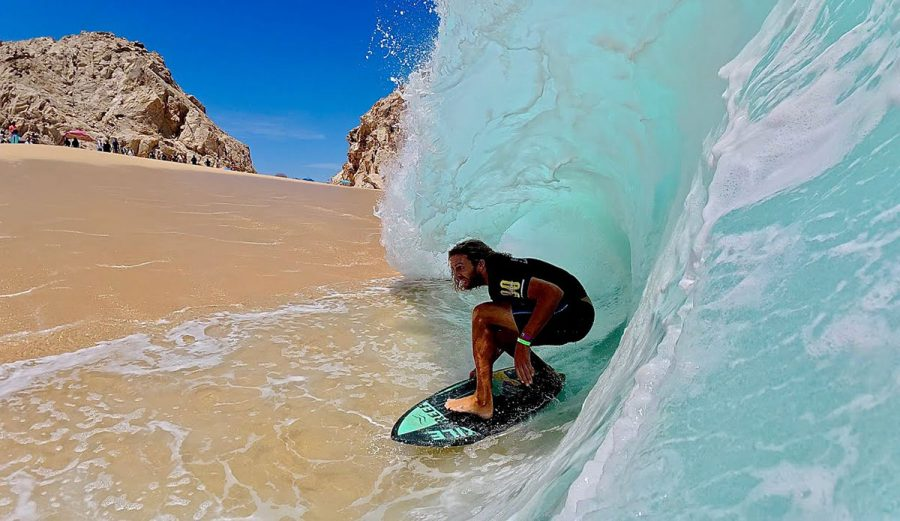
- Professional skimboarder Blair Conklin riding his skimboard and being barreled in Cabo San Lucas, Mexico
- First played: 1920s, Laguna Beach, California, US

Characteristics
- Type: Outdoor
- Equipment: Skimboard, traction pad, wetsuit

Presence
- Olympic: No
- Paralympic: No

Skimboarding, also known as skimming, is a boardsport in which a skimboard (much like a surfboard but smaller and without fins) is used to glide across wet sand and the water's surface to meet an incoming breaking wave and ride it back to shore. Unlike surfing, skimboarding begins on the beach by dropping the board onto the thin wash of previous waves. Skimboarders use their momentum to skim out to breaking waves which they then catch and ride back to shore in a manner similar to surfing.

Another approach to skimboarding is "flatland", which involves performing tricks derived from skateboarding, such as ollies and shove-its on the wash of waves without focusing on catching and riding waves.

A newer style of skimboarding, coined "urban skimboarding", has recently appeared and become popularized by four-time European skimboarding champion Adrien Raza which uses the city instead of the beach to skimboard. Urban skimboarding takes advantage of fountains, canals, water mirrors, and just about anywhere there is a shallow body of water in the city.

== History ==
=== Origins ===
Skimboarding at Seal Beach, 2011

While the exact origin of skimboarding isn't known for certain, most attribute its roots to the Polynesian pioneers who also developed surfing. The sport's initial popularity surged in Laguna Beach, California where the natural landscape was ideal for the development of skimboarding with steep shorelines and frequent shorebreak. The local progression and development of the sport led Tex Haines and Peter Prietto to develop foam and fiberglass skimboards through their company Victoria Skimboards. Victoria Skimboards' inception and growth of the sport served as the catalyst for the building of one of the largest skimboarding communities in the world based in Laguna Beach, California. Started in 1976, the annual 'Vic' Skimboarding World Championship is held at Aliso Beach in Laguna Beach and is a long-running skim boarding contest on the pro circuit.

=== Growth of the sport ===
Florida began making similar advancements in the sport, community, and development of skimboard construction, following the increase of skimboarding popularity in Laguna Beach. Floridian skimboarders found themselves taking advantage of the more frequent shorebreak their beaches offered, even on days with small swell that would be unappealing for traditional surfboards. While Florida and the East Coast's beaches and breaks may not exhibit the large and powerful waves of California, much of the East Coast is ideal for skimboarding, even far up the North, which has led to an diverse and cooperative community of riders and the first competitive skimboarding tour series Skim USA.

=== International popularity ===
Skimboarding has slowly grown into a global sport with notable locations and riders from Mexico, Brazil, the United States, and several European nations. The sport's growth and popularity eventually led to the creation of various contests and non-profits with the United Skim Tour (UST) series focusing on expanding to international skimboarding locations.

== Skimboard characteristics ==
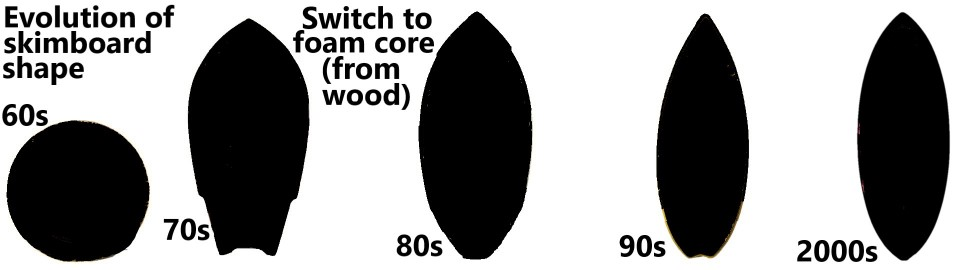
The Evolution of Skimboard Shapes

=== History of construction ===
Skimboards were originally made of wood and often sealed with resin material to waterproof the construction. While flatland skimboards stick with a similar construction in modern times, boards for wave riding eventually adapted the foam and fiberglass construction already common in surfing. Initially using more common materials such as basic fiberglass and polyester resin, much of the industry has moved on to carbon fiber and epoxy resin for improved skimboard durability.

=== Flatland vs. wave riding construction ===
While flatland skimboards typically have less material and construction variance compared to their wave riding counterparts, flatland skimboards remain ideal for trick performance (akin to a skateboard). Wave riding skimboards adopt more variance in construction and materials similar to the surfboards they were often based on. Smaller wave riding skimboards, much like their surfboard predecessors, exhibit quick, snappy turns, while larger skimboards exhibit speed retention on weaker waves, both of which can have great variance between shapes, particularly at the tail (back/rear) of the board (see "The Evolution of Skimboard Shapes" graphic above). Wave riding skimboards implement various rocker profiles at the bottom of the board which assists in handling the transition of the skimboard from the thin, static water, or wet sand, to the deeper, rushing water where waves can be ridden back to shore. Steeper beaches greatly benefit from increased rocker in a skimboard to better assist the skimboarder's transition to the waves from shore.

=== Skimboard traction ===
While wave riders will often use a combination of traction pad products and wax products to increase surface traction on the deck of the skimboard, flatland skimboarders have largely transitioned to using a full traction pad setup, with the construction of flatland skimboards often coming pre-built with a foam-like traction pad which covers the entire surface of the deck of the board eliminating the need for after-market board wax or traction pads. Some wave riders have adopted a similar traction style by using third-party products, although it is still more common to find a skimboarder using just wax, some traction pads, or a combination of the two on their board.

== Dangers of skimboarding ==
Skimboarding often requires a strict set of features and conditions that lead to ideal skim waves, such as steeper shorelines, coarse sand without shells or pebbles, as well as nearby cliff or rock features that alter wave direction. Thus, skimboarders face a variety of risks and injuries when flatland or wave riding. It is not uncommon to see fractures or dislocations of the lower limbs with some requiring serious medical attention. Lacerations, twisted ankles, and bruises are also common due to impacts with the skimboard itself, rocks, and other obstacles present on beaches. Hamstring injuries are also common due to the fast and extreme movement of a skimboarder's legs when they run toward the water and transition onto the board. In larger shorebreaks in places such as Cabo San Lucas, Mexico, The Wedge, Newport Beach, California, and Aliso Beach, California, direct bodily impact with the sea floor becomes much more of a major concern, particularly to the spine (a concern not as common in surfing which is often done in deeper water).

== Notable skimboarders ==
- Bill “Beaker” Bryan
- Blair Conklin
- Lucas Fink
- Paulo Prietto
- Sophia Nguyen
- Isabel Blanco
- Adrien Raza
