= Flatland skimboarding =

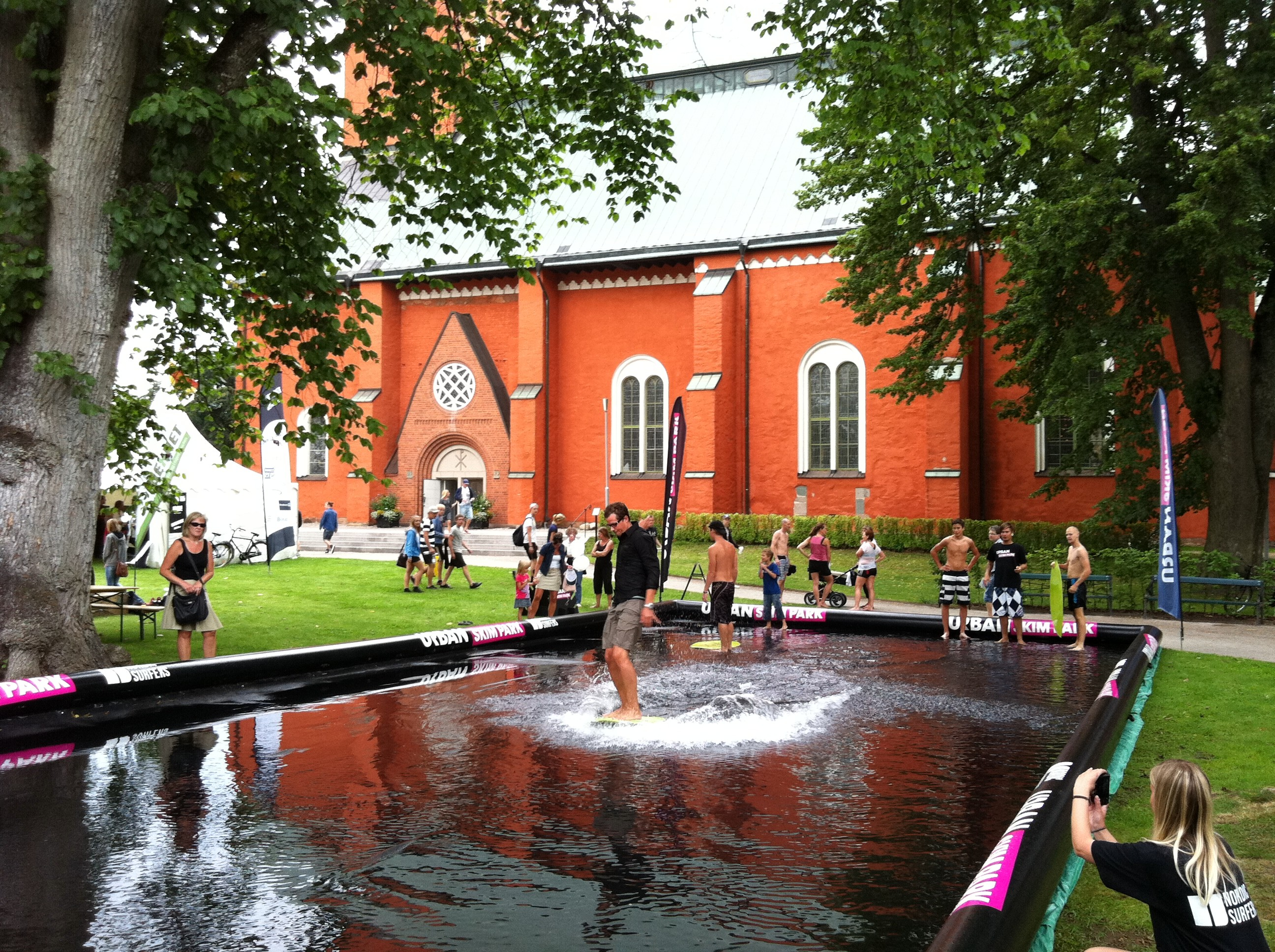
Flatland skimboarding

Flatland skimboarding (also known as inland skimboarding) is a form of skimboarding practiced on non-coastal waters, such as a river, lake, stream or puddle. It uses a wooden board about three times as wide as a skateboard and one and a half times as long. The board is thrown across a thin film of water. While the board is still moving the rider jumps on and skims across the water to perform tricks.

== History ==
Inland skimboarding emerged in the mid 1970s and has its roots in Sacramento, California. With homemade skimboards made of plywood, fiberglass and resin, skimmers used sandbars along the American and Sacramento rivers to practice.

The freestyle aspects of inland skimboarding were pioneered in the early 1980s by two Sacramento locals: Launie Porteous and Mark Robinson. Influenced by the emerging skateboard scene, they began adapting skateboarding skills to skimboarding, creating the concept of freestyle skimboarding.

The evolution of the Ollie on a skimboard allowed skimmers to ollie over obstacles and enabled more technical tricks, such as riding up the side of a wet river bank and coming back down to simulate a 1/4 pipe.

In the late 1980s, skimmers advanced to building better rails and jumps and adapting more technical skateboard tricks, but still used props from their environment like shopping carts, road cones, and trash cans as obstacles.

In the 1990s, an inland skimboard scene started in Utah, influenced by Sacramento skimmers that moved there. By the late 1990s, inland skimboarding had emerged in other US cities, Canada, and Australia.

== Differences from other boardsports ==
Flatland skimboarding can be done almost anywhere in the world as it requires only a shallow pool of water. When riding rails in flatland skimming, snowboarding and skateboarding tricks can be combined into one. The lack of trucks to prevent the rider from spinning creates many variations and combinations of tricks, when combined with the non-binding skateboard tricks such as big-spins and pop shuv-its.

== Boards ==
In the late 1970s and early 80s, companies such as J-Gordon and Victoria manufactured wood skimboards for local California surf and skateboard shops. Inland shops like Goskate of Sacramento offered skimboards to the local crowd, followed by Surf&Skate in Sacramento shortly after.

Before the availability of production-made boards, inland skimmers made their own wood boards from scratch, in a teardrop or tombstone shape. Current designs and constructions have not changed significantly, but the new preferred shape for most inland skimmers is a twin-tip or symmetrical shaped board.

Inland skimmers encounter obstacles including countless rocks, sticks, logs, clam shells, railsliders, run-away boards, and so on, which will eventually destroy any foam board, so wood is still the preferred material for most inland skimmers.
