= Santa Ana and Newport Railway =

Santa Ana & Newport Railway
Overview
- Locale: Orange County, California
- Dates of operation: 1890–1899
- Successor: Southern Pacific

Technical
- Track gauge: 4 ft 8 1/2 in (1,435 mm) standard gauge
- Length: 22.47 miles (36.16 km)

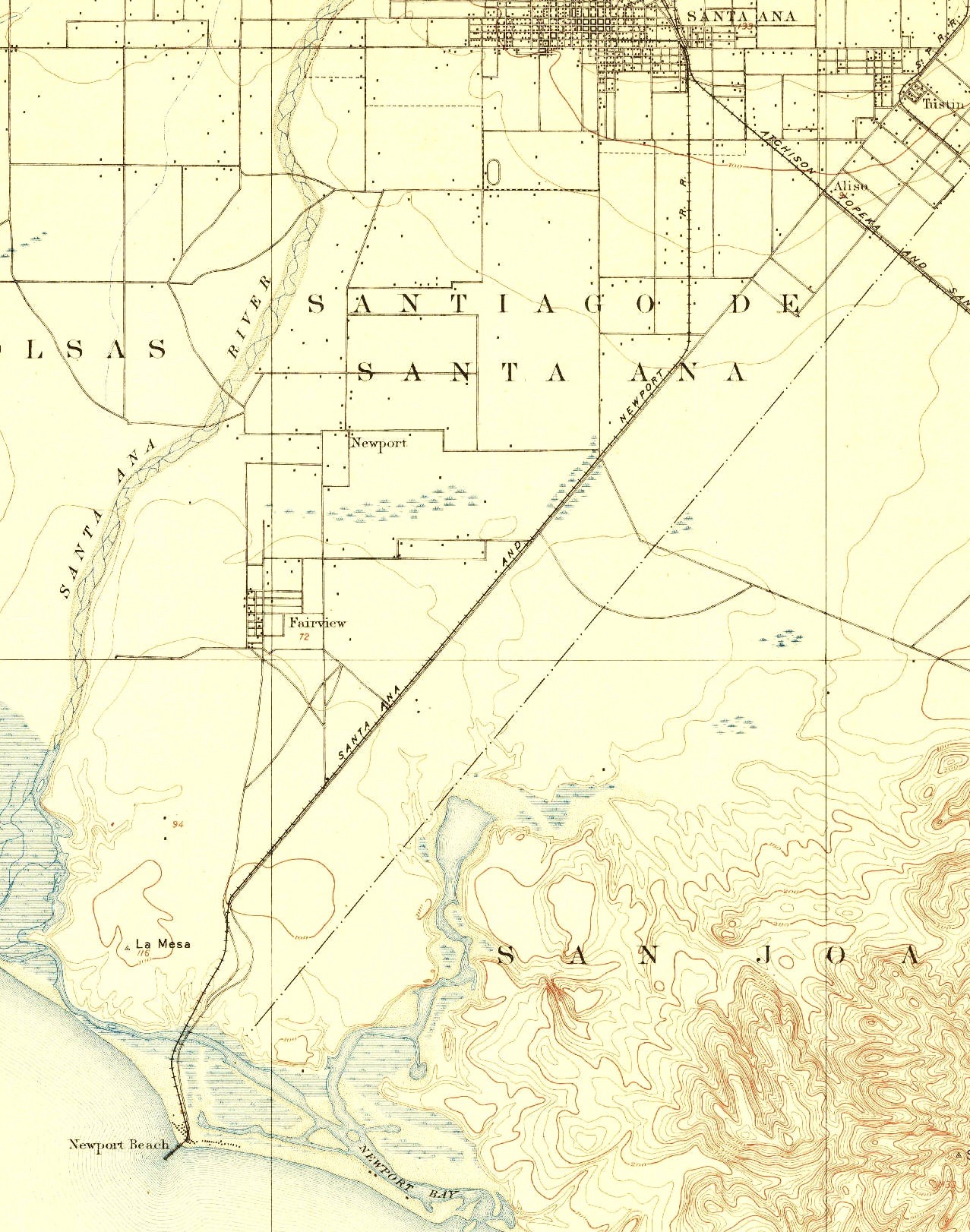
Route in 1896

The Santa Ana Rail Road was formed by the Newport Wharf and Lumber Company on August 23, 1889 to build a railway connection from the lumber company wharf in Newport Beach, California to the national rail network in Santa Ana, California. The 11.71-mile (18.85 km) rail line was built in 1890 and operated as a freight line until passenger service was begun in 1891. Southern Pacific formed the Santa Ana and Newport Railway (SA&N) on November 7, 1892 to acquire the line from the lumber company on February 11, 1893. On March 28, 1899 SA&N purchased the unbuilt Santa and Westminster Railway incorporated on August 5, 1890, and built a station on 2nd Street in Santa Ana to hold the franchise for an 9-mile (14 km) line connecting Santa Ana and Westminster, California. Construction of a 10.76-mile (17.32 km) branch from Newport to Smeltzer began in 1899, but was incomplete when Southern Pacific merged the SA&N on November 23, 1899, and did not begin operation until 1 January 1900.

== Independent operations ==
Shipping in Newport Bay was on a small scale until McFadden's built the McFadden Wharf in 1889 to allow unloading larger ships. Railway construction materials arrived by ship, and grading commenced in the summer of 1890 to extend a railroad from the wharf. A trestle was built across the Santa Ana River where it entered Newport Bay; and track laying was completed in January 1891. The first locomotive arrived in December 1890 to assist construction activities and later served as the wharf switcher to become known as the cotton tail. A second locomotive known as the tea kettle or jack rabbit and three passenger coaches arrived in the summer of 1891; and passenger service began with a picnic excursion to the beach. With connections with both the Southern Pacific and Santa Fe Railroads at Santa Ana, twelve-thousand passengers rode the line annually in a daily winter train and thrice daily summer service; but passengers accounted for less than five percent of railroad income. The railroad transported 70,000 tons of freight annually. The largest fraction of that freight was lumber unloaded from schooners for distribution throughout southern California. Incoming merchandise and outgoing agricultural produce were also important.

== SA&N locomotives ==
Number	Builder	Type	Date	Works number	Notes
#1	Rhode Island Locomotive Works	0-4-0 tank locomotive	1885		built for New York Elevated Railroad; purchased from Los Angeles and Pacific Railroad in 1890; sold to Eagle Salt Works Railroad on 24 September 1903
#2	Baldwin Locomotive Works	2-4-2 tank locomotive	1887	8681	built for Los Angeles County Railroad; purchased from Los Angeles and Pacific Railroad in 1891; sold to Liverpool Salt Works in February 1903
#4	Baldwin Locomotive Works	4-4-0	1887	8948	built for Los Angeles County Railroad; purchased from Los Angeles and Pacific Railroad in 1895; became Southern Pacific 2nd #1202 in January 1902

== Southern Pacific ==
The Santa Fe Railroad began sharing the Newport wharf after the Santa Fe wharf at Redondo Beach, California washed out in the autumn of 1892. Southern Pacific's SA&N subsidiary purchased the Santa Ana Railroad in 1893 to deny Newport wharf access to its competitor. The SA&N was merged into Southern Pacific in 1899. The Smeltzer branch line took its name from the ranch at its terminus. The branch saw daily trains during the winter celery harvest, but twice weekly service for the remainder of the year. Freight traffic disappeared as agricultural land became residential, and larger freighters were unable to use Newport Bay. Southern Pacific sold 2.66 miles (4.28 km) of the track between Wiebling and Huntington Beach, California to Pacific Electric. The remaining line west of Dyer was abandoned in 1933.
