= Balboa Inn =

Coordinates: 33°36′05″N 117°54′00″W

- U.S. National Register of Historic Places
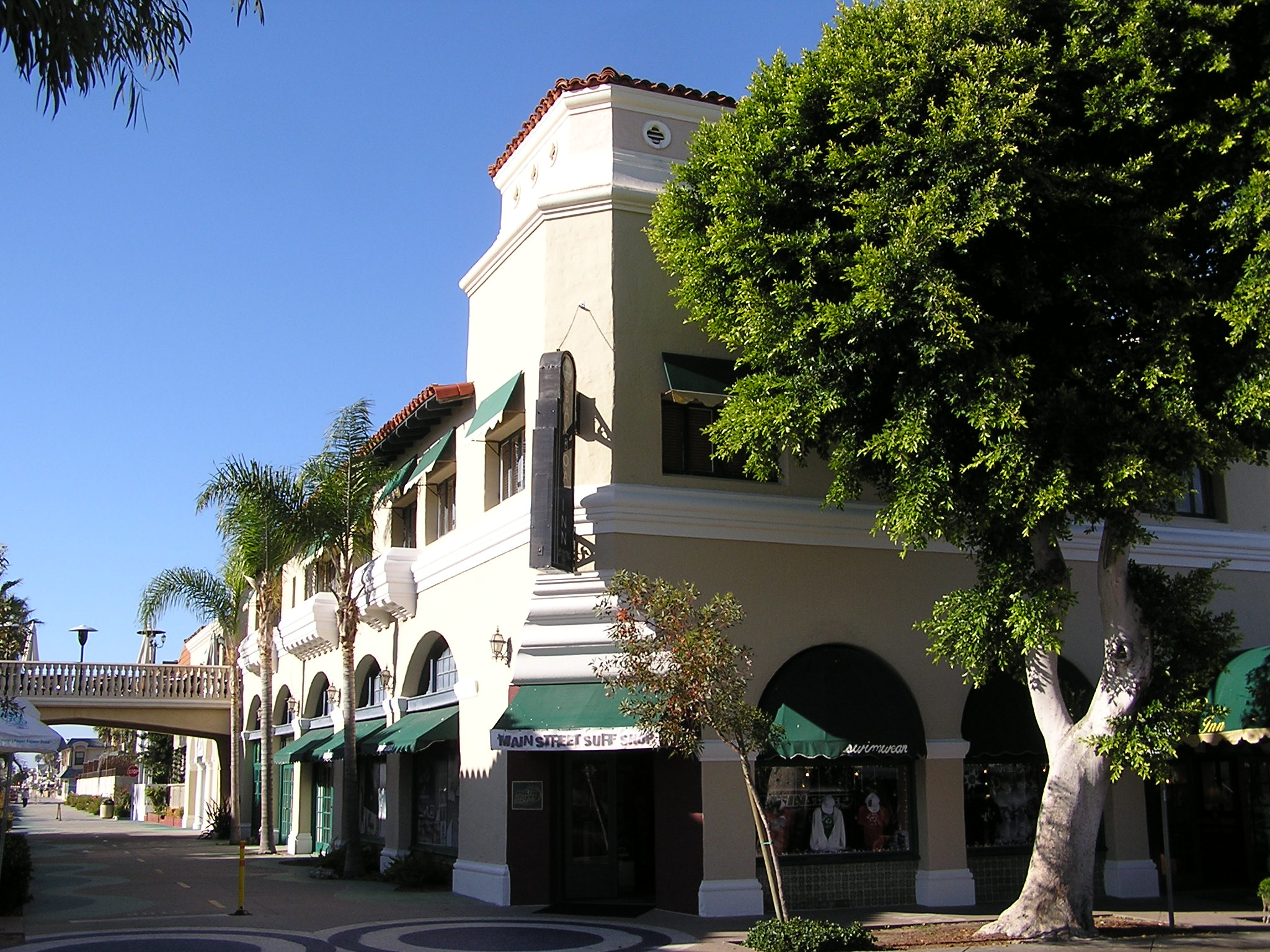
- Location: 105 Main Street; Newport Beach, California
- Architect: Walter Roland Hagedohm
- NRHP reference No.: 86000730
- Added to NRHP: April 11, 1986

The Balboa Inn is a hotel located on the Balboa Peninsula in the city of Newport Beach, California.

== Background ==
The hotel was established in 1930, and added to the National Register of Historic Places in 1986. The architect was Walter Roland Hagedohm. It is in the Mission/Spanish Colonial Revival styles.
