= Blair Conklin =

American skimboarder (born 1995)

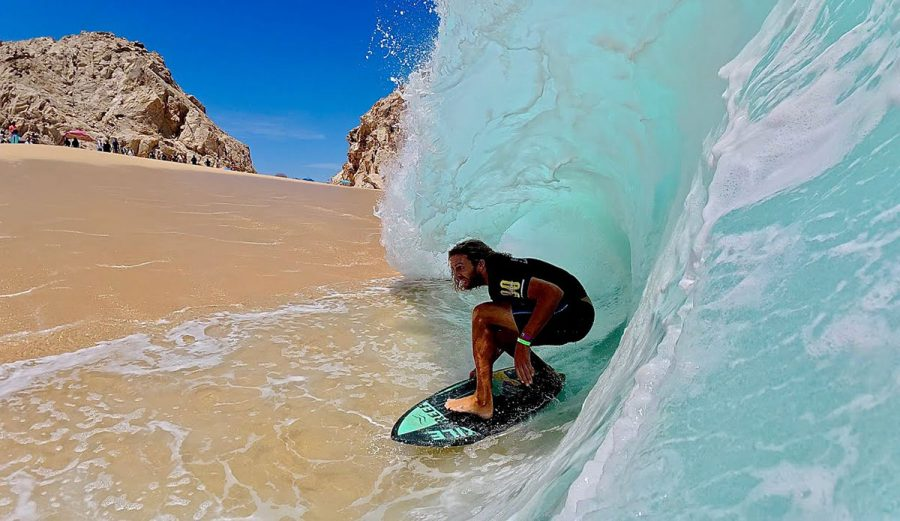
- Blair Conklin skimboarding in Cabo San Lucas
- Born: Laguna Beach, California
- Occupations: Skimboarder; Surfer; Bodyboarder; Content creator

YouTube information
- Channel: SkidKids
- Years active: 2018–
- Genre: Watersports
- Subscribers: 3.88M
- Views: 3.74B
- Sports career
- Sport: Skimboarding
- Turned pro: 2010
- Last updated: April 15, 2025

Blair Conklin is an American professional skimboarder and YouTuber. Conklin won the United Skim Tour championship title three consecutive years from 2015 to 2017.

== Early life and childhood ==
Conklin was raised in Laguna Beach. He surfed on his high school team but regularly skimmed because of the town's shore break. Conklin earned a bachelor's degree in Environmental Sciences from the University of California, Berkeley.

== Career ==
=== Skimboarding ===
After routinely earning silver and bronze in the UST, Conklin won his first United Skim Tour title in 2016, finishing in at least the top four of every competition he participated in along the tour. Conklin would go on to three-peat at UST champion, winning again in 2017 and 2018. In 2019, Conklin finished second on the UST. In 2021, Conklin only competed part-time in UST, and since then has not participated in the UST.

=== Youtuber ===
Conklin runs a YouTube channel titled "Skid Kids".

== Career victories ==
UST Wins
Year	Event	Venue	Country or State	Event Wins
2021	Exile Oktoberfest	Newport Beach, California	California	18°
2019	Exile Oktoberfest	Newport Beach, California	California	17°
2019	TAC Skimblast	Santa Cruz, California	California	16°
2018	The Vic at Aliso Beach	Laguna Beach, California	California	15°
2018	Zap Pro/Am	Dewey Beach, Delaware	Delaware	14°
2017	TAC Skimblast	Santa Cruz, California	California	13°
2017	Internacional de Skimboard	Torres Vedras	Portugal	12°
2016	Exile Oktoberfest	Newport Beach, California	California	11°
2016	TAC Skimblast	Santa Cruz, California	California	10°
2016	Zap Pro/Am	Dewey Beach, Delaware	Delaware	9°
2015	Exile Oktoberfest	Newport Beach, California	California	8°
2015	Sununga World Cup	Ubatuba	Brazil	7°
2014	Exile Oktoberfest	Newport Beach, California	California	6°
2014	TAC Skimblast	Santa Cruz, California	California	5°
2013	TAC Skimblast	Santa Cruz, California	California	4°
2013	The Vic at Aliso Beach	Laguna Beach, California	California	3°
2012	Zap Pro/Am	Dewey Beach, Delaware	Delaware	2°
2011	TAC Skimblast	Santa Cruz, California	California	1°
