= Newport Bay (California) =

Bay in southern California, USA

Coordinates: 33°36′30″N 117°54′33″W

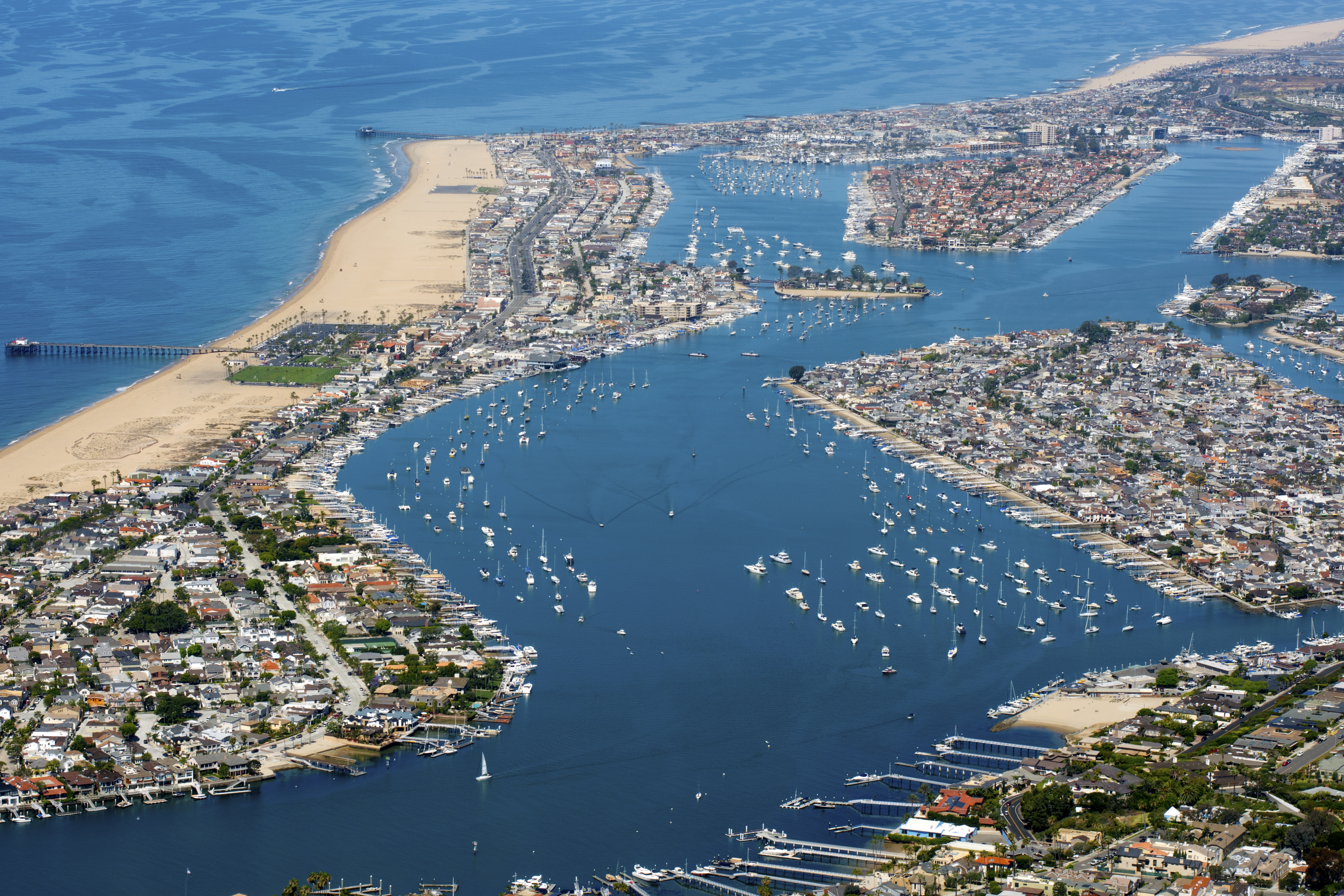
Newport Beach CA

Newport Bay, in Southern California, United States, is the lower bay formed along the coast below the Upper Newport Bay, after the end of the Pleistocene. It was formed by sand, brought by ocean currents from the Santa Ana River and other rivers to the north, which constructed an offshore beach, now called the Balboa Peninsula. The bay was named by the Spanish Bolsa de Gengar in the 18th century, to refer to the nearby Tongva and Acjachemen village of Genga. An estuary of the Santa Ana River in the late 19th century, it was dredged to form Newport Harbor, the harbor of Newport Beach.

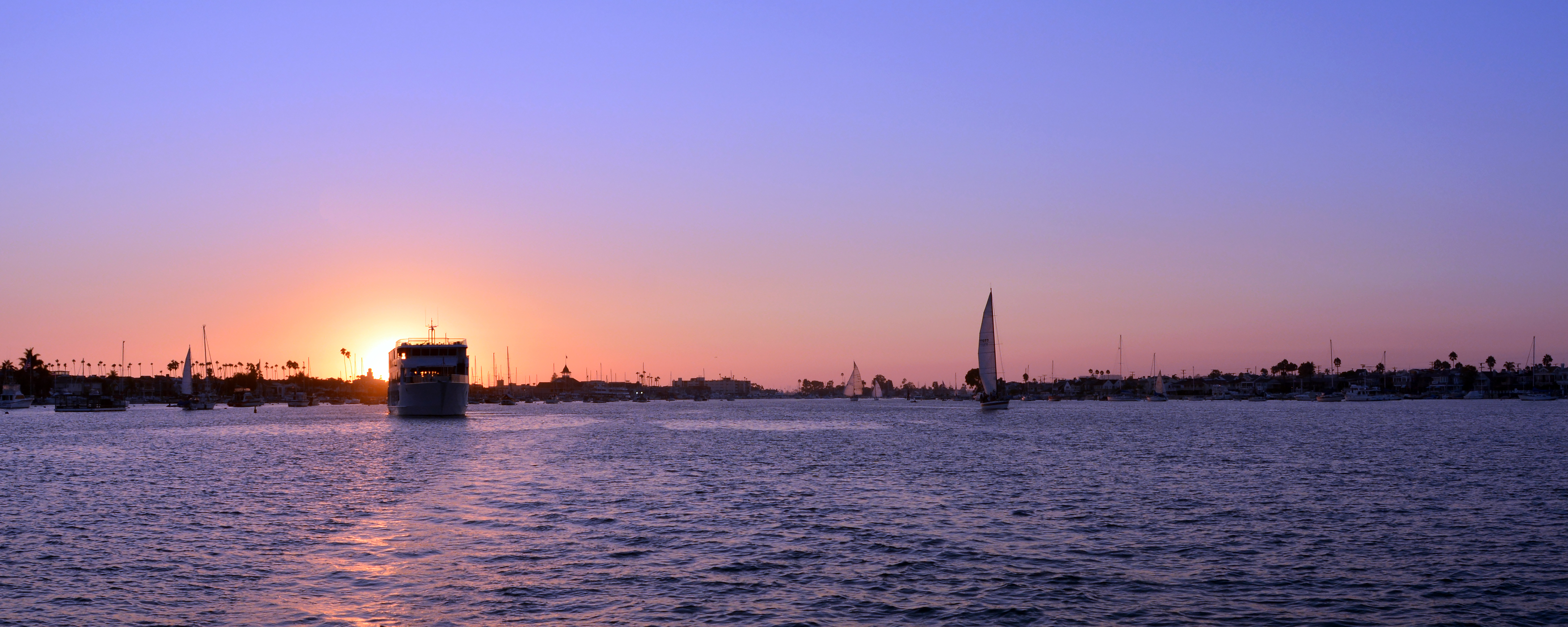
Newport Harbor Sunset
