= Dory Fish Market =

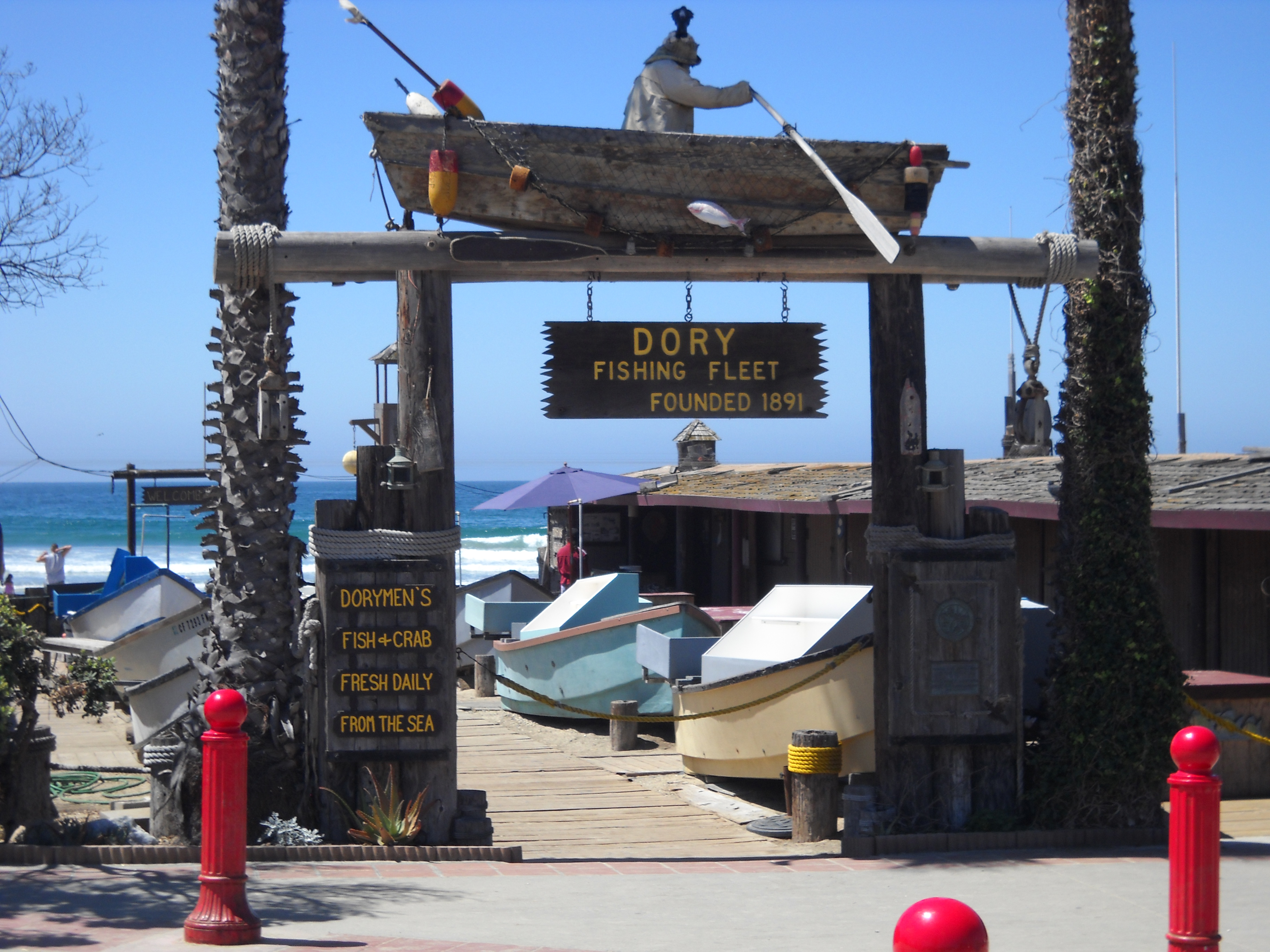

The Dory Fishing Fleet and Market is a beachside fishing cooperative located in the city of Newport Beach, California. It was founded in 1891 at the base of what was then McFadden Wharf, now known as the Newport Pier. The Dory Fleet, a registered historical landmark, is considered the last beachside cooperative of its kind in the United States.

The Dory Fleet Market was founded in late 1891 when an enterprising fisherman started marketing his catch directly to the public rather than going through wholesalers. The market is open 5 days a week. Saturdays have the most diverse catch, where live crab, sea urchin, fish, spot prawns, snails, spiny lobster and sea cucumbers are available depending on the season. Each day the fishermen launch their boats at around 2 AM, returning at around 6 to 9 AM with that day's catch.
