= Bahia Corinthian Yacht Club =

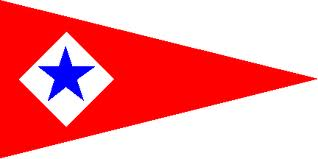
- Burgee
- Founded: 1959
- Location: 1601 Bayside Drive, Newport Beach, California
- Website: www.bcyc.org

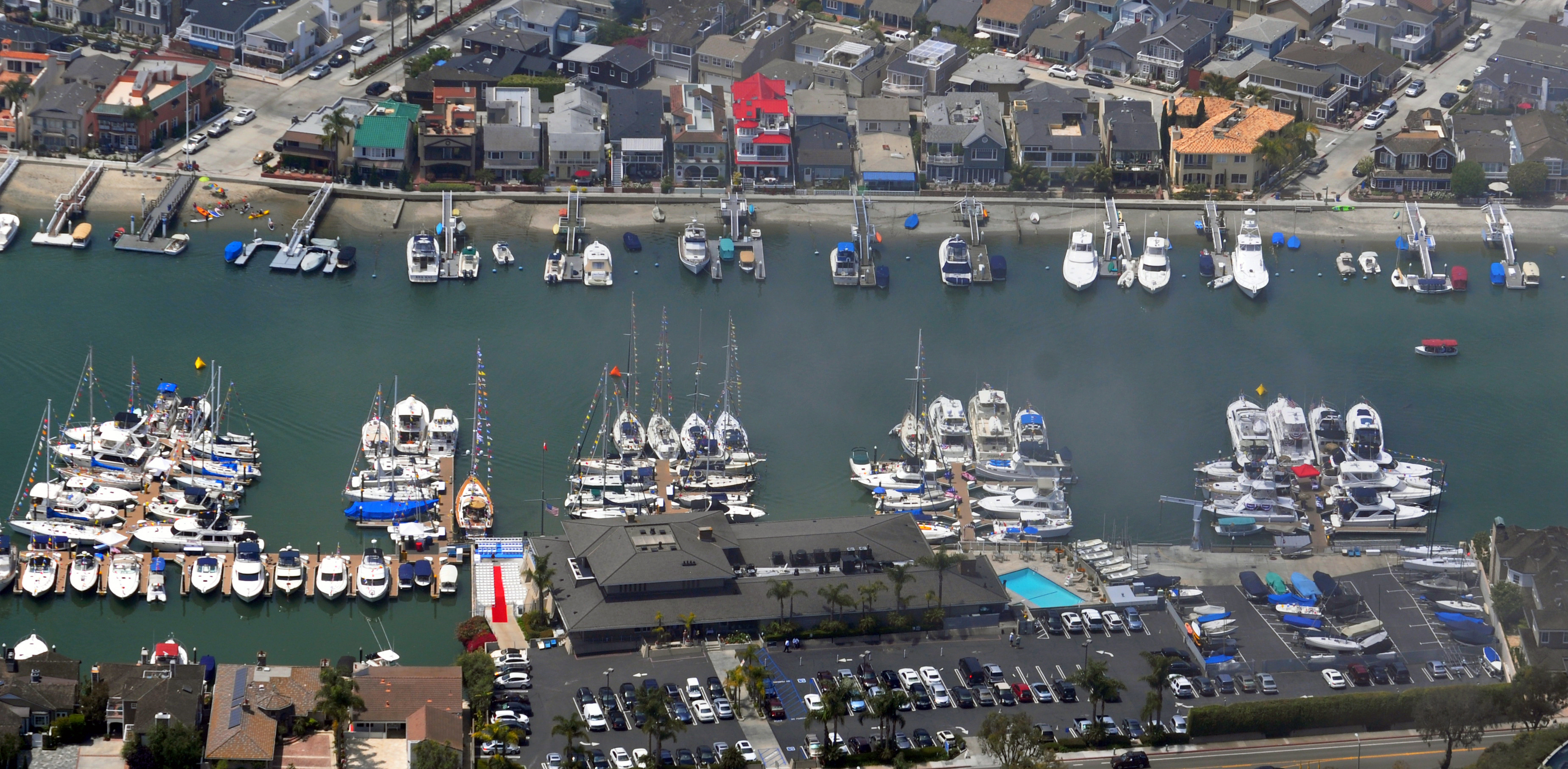
BCYC opening day, 2013

Bahia Corinthian Yacht Club (BCYC) is a yacht club located in Newport Beach, Orange County, California.

== Description ==
In 1958 ten yachtsmen founded the club as "Bahia Yacht Club" in space leased from the Balboa Bay Club. Initially, most of the members were Southern California yacht racing sailors. In 1968, the club joined with the Orange Coast Yacht Club and changed its name to "Bahia Corinthian Yacht Club".

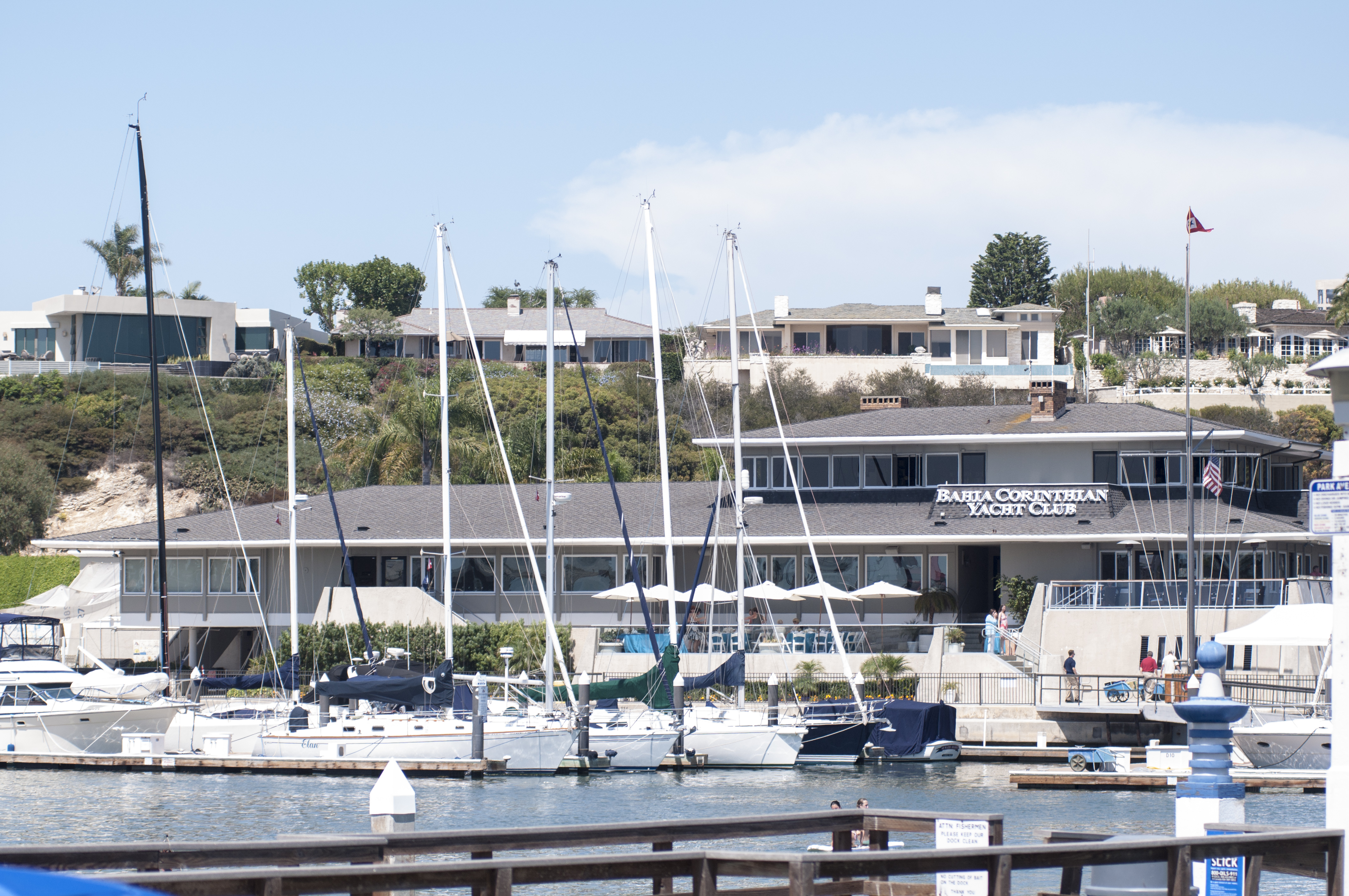
Club house

The club leased space for many years from the Irvine Company, and purchased the land and marina in 1993. The clubhouse, dedicated in 1971, has a main dining room and outdoor seating. Wet and dry slips are available for members for a monthly fee. The wet slips can accommodate boats up to 80 feet in length, and the dry slips boats up to 25 feet in length. The club is open 5 days a week, and has a full-time dock staff and shore boat.

Bahia Corinthian Yacht Club has a junior sailing program that participates in events with other Newport Beach yacht clubs.

== Americas Cup ==
The Bahia Corinthian Yacht Club was the first West Coast yacht club to create an America's Cup contender when Pat Dougan entered Columbia in the 1964 trials. Its crew consisted of Bahia Corinthian Yacht Club members.

== See also ==
- List of International Council of Yacht Clubs members
