= Balboa Bay Resort =

Resort hotel in Newport Beach, California, United States

Coordinates: 33°36′56″N 117°54′50″W

Balboa Bay Club and Resort
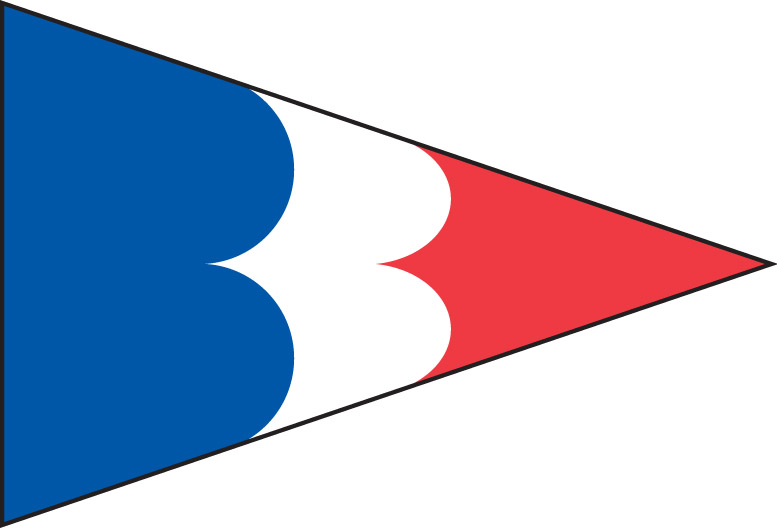
- Burgee
- Founded: 1948
- Location: 1221 West Coast Highway, Newport Beach, California, United States
- Website: balboabayclub.com

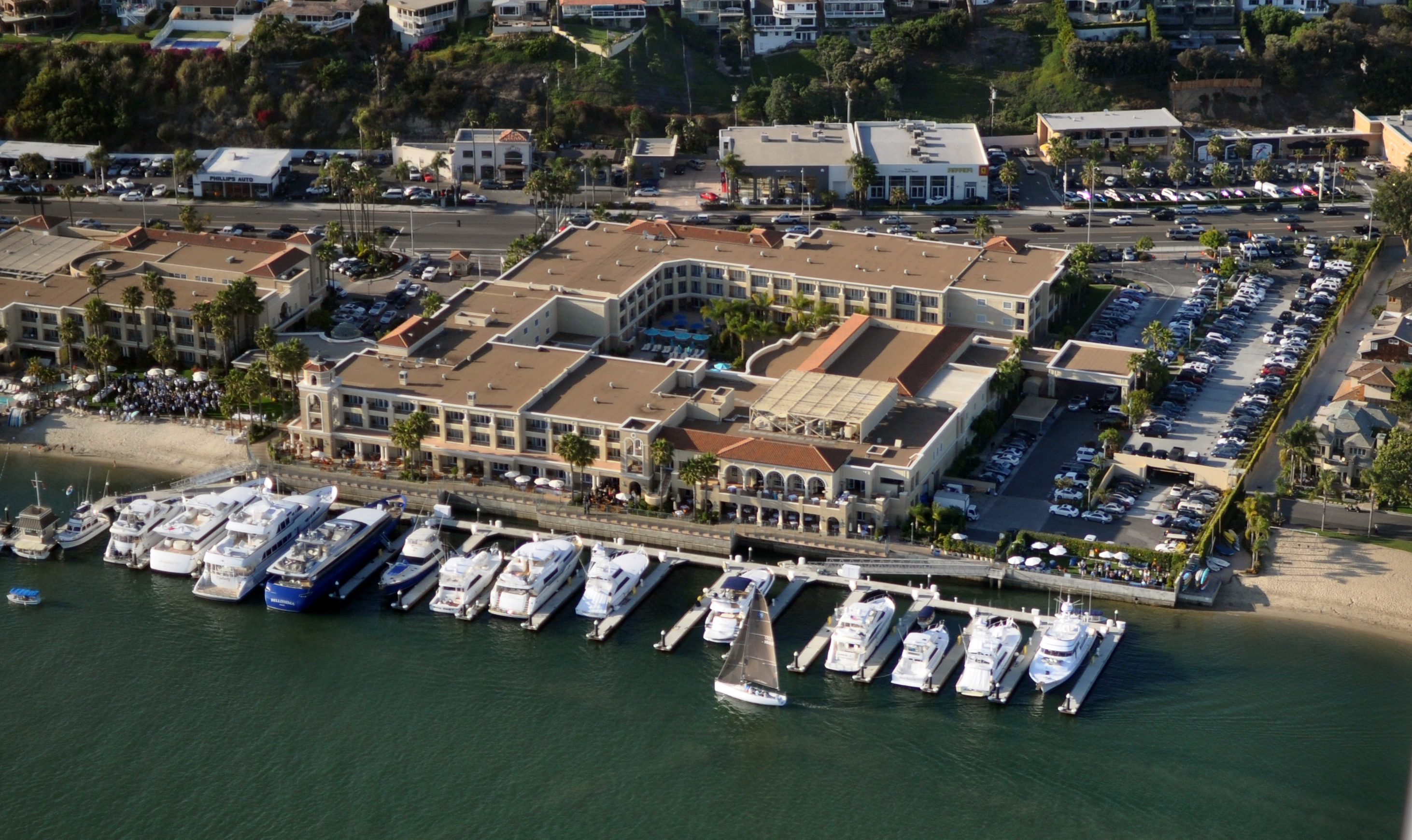
Balboa Bay Resort

The Balboa Bay Resort is a 160-room resort hotel in Newport Beach, California, United States on 15 acres (6.1 ha). The facility was founded in 1948 as the Balboa Bay Club, a private yacht club. The Balboa Bay Club includes a 130-slip marina, private beach, waterfront pools, private restaurant, a spa and fitness center, and 145 apartments on the Newport Beach Harbor waterfront on the Pacific Coast Highway.

== Facilities ==
Originally called The Balboa Bay Club and Resort, the facility opened in May 2003 as a waterfront hotel, resort, and separate private members yacht club. Over its history the club has seen many changes and additions to its structures. The club today features a hotel, as well as short and long term apartments, located on the oceanfront.

A restaurant, "The First Cabin", a bar, "Duke's Place", and a library/lounge were revised in 2014 and renamed "Waterline" & "A&O Kitchen + Bar" respectively within the Resort/BBR. The Resort underwent renovations that were completed in 2016. The Resort provides 11 meeting and board rooms. The Resort and Club each have their own pools. A 17,000-square-foot spa and fitness center is located in the members’ clubhouse. The Residences also has a pool located in its complex.

In May 2012, the new owners announced that plans to again renovate the club were under development and it went on the state that public meetings would be held to allow for input from the public.

The Balboa Bay Club at one time had tennis courts onsite and also had an off-site tennis club, named the Balboa Bay Racquet Club located in the nearby Newport Center. The Balboa Bay Racquet Club is now The Tennis Club at the Newport Beach Country Club.

== History ==
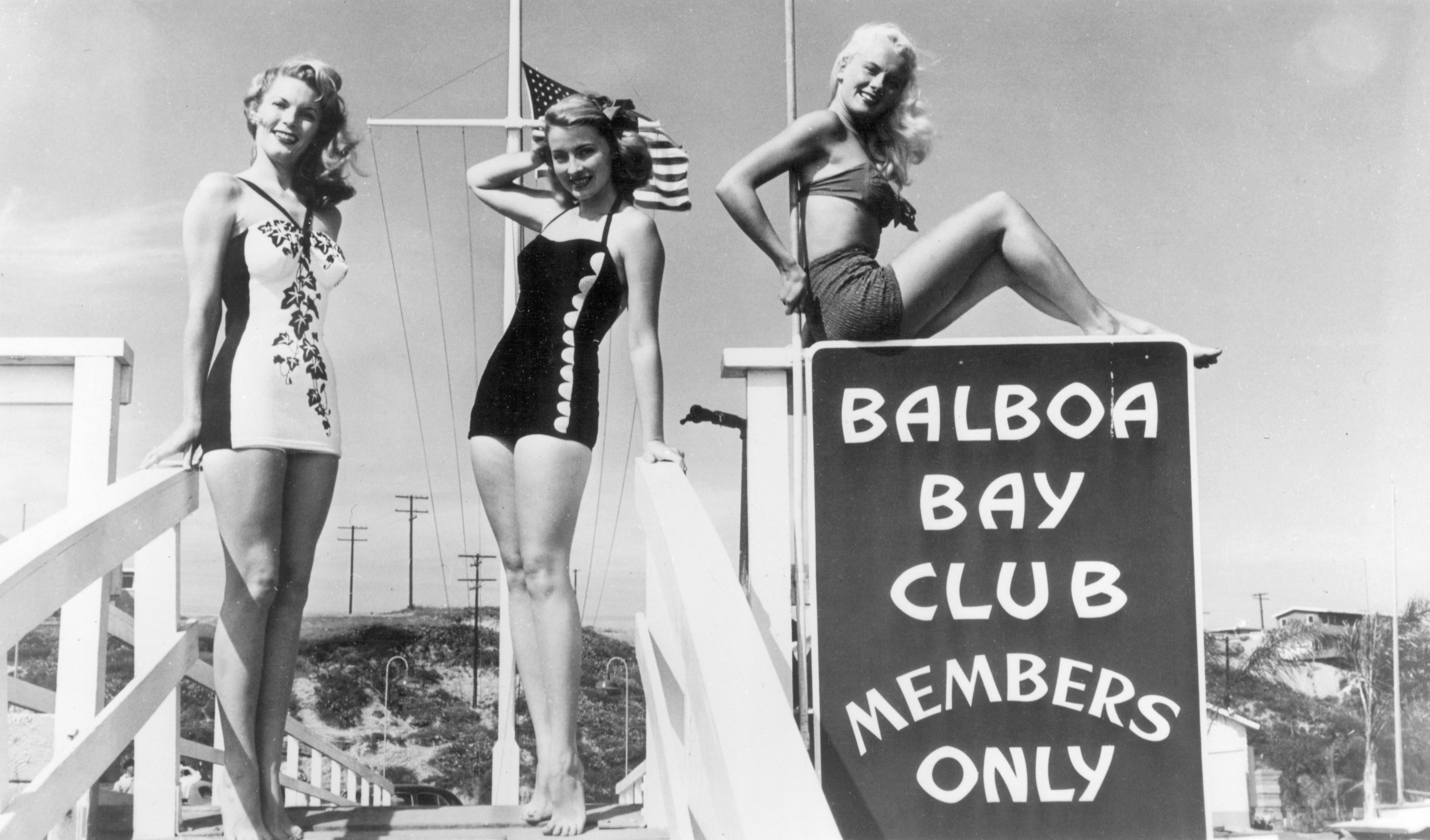
Balboa Bay Club, courtesy Orange County Archives

The original, private Balboa Bay Club was owned by Jack Wrather from 1960 until 1971, when he sold it to William Ray. In 1988, William Ray was inducted into the International Hall of Fame for his conservation efforts.

Ray died in 1991, and his widow, Beverly Ray Parkhurst owned the club until 2012. The 160-room hotel opened to the public on May 14, 2003. In 2011, the club was sold to Winston Chung, a Hong Kong businessman. It was later reported that the sale to Chung fell out of escrow as Chung was having difficulty moving funds out of China to pay for the purchase.

In June 2012, the BBC was sold to Richard H. Pickup and his family members, Eagle Four Partners and Pacific Hospitality Group, LLC The Resort & Club is now fully independent and owned by Eagle Four Partners, making up the entity of International Bay Clubs.

In 2013, the Balboa Bay Club and Resort was renamed as two separate entities and opened its renovated resort 'Balboa Bay Resort' to the public. The club continues to be open for members only.

The club has been host to many notable people over the years, including: presidents, politicians, business leaders and actors, including John Wayne, Humphrey Bogart, Robert Wagner, Lauren Bacall, Natalie Wood, John Travolta, Jerry Seinfeld, Jim Carrey, Russell Simmons, Barry Goldwater. For many years it had a public board of directors and many Newport Beach residents served on the board.

Tennis tournaments were held at the resort, beginning in 1958.

== Marina ==
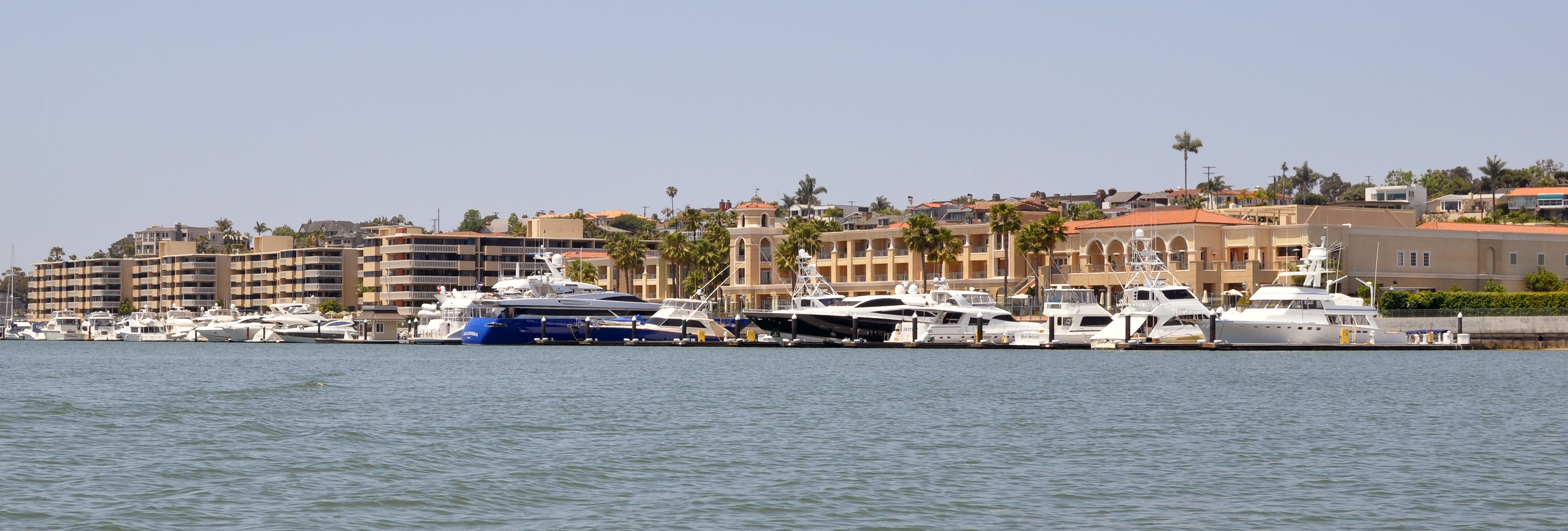
Balboa Bay Resort, May 23, 2013

The Balboa Bay Resort can accommodate up to 150 boats of all sizes in its waterfront marina.

Over the years the club has hosted such well known vessels as the Primadonna, the Mojo — owner Frank Muller, the sailing yacht Sirius II, and the Viking Princess — owners Reed and Rita Sprinkle. In 1996 the club was visited by the America's Cup J-class racing yacht Endeavour, under charter to the Sprinkles.

The Balboa Bay Club is well known as a prime viewing location for the annual Newport Beach Christmas boat parade, hailed as "one of the top ten holiday happenings in the nation" by the New York Times. In 2011 the Balboa Bay Club honoured the winners of the 102nd annual Newport Beach Christmas Boat Parade and Ring of Lights at a public awards dinner and auction. Also a key viewing area for the Beer Can Races, a summer weekly event among sailors in the Newport Beach harbor for decades.

In the 1970s the club's main beach area rented small sailboats and offered sailing instruction during the summer. A small boat dry storage area provided a crane service for launching that was removed during the 2003 renovation when the area was converted to a private members only pool and outdoor bar. The club now provides access to rental of small electric boats, as well as paddle boards and kayaks. The club's B dock now hosts the rental fleet.

Today the club and resort's marina facilities primarily accommodates power boats and large motor yachts. The club provides a Guest Dock for visiting yachtsmen and the guest dock also serves as home to the Dock Masters office. Visiting yachtsmen are asked to contact the club's dockmaster to arrange for accommodation.
