= Newport Beach, California =

City in California, United States

- City
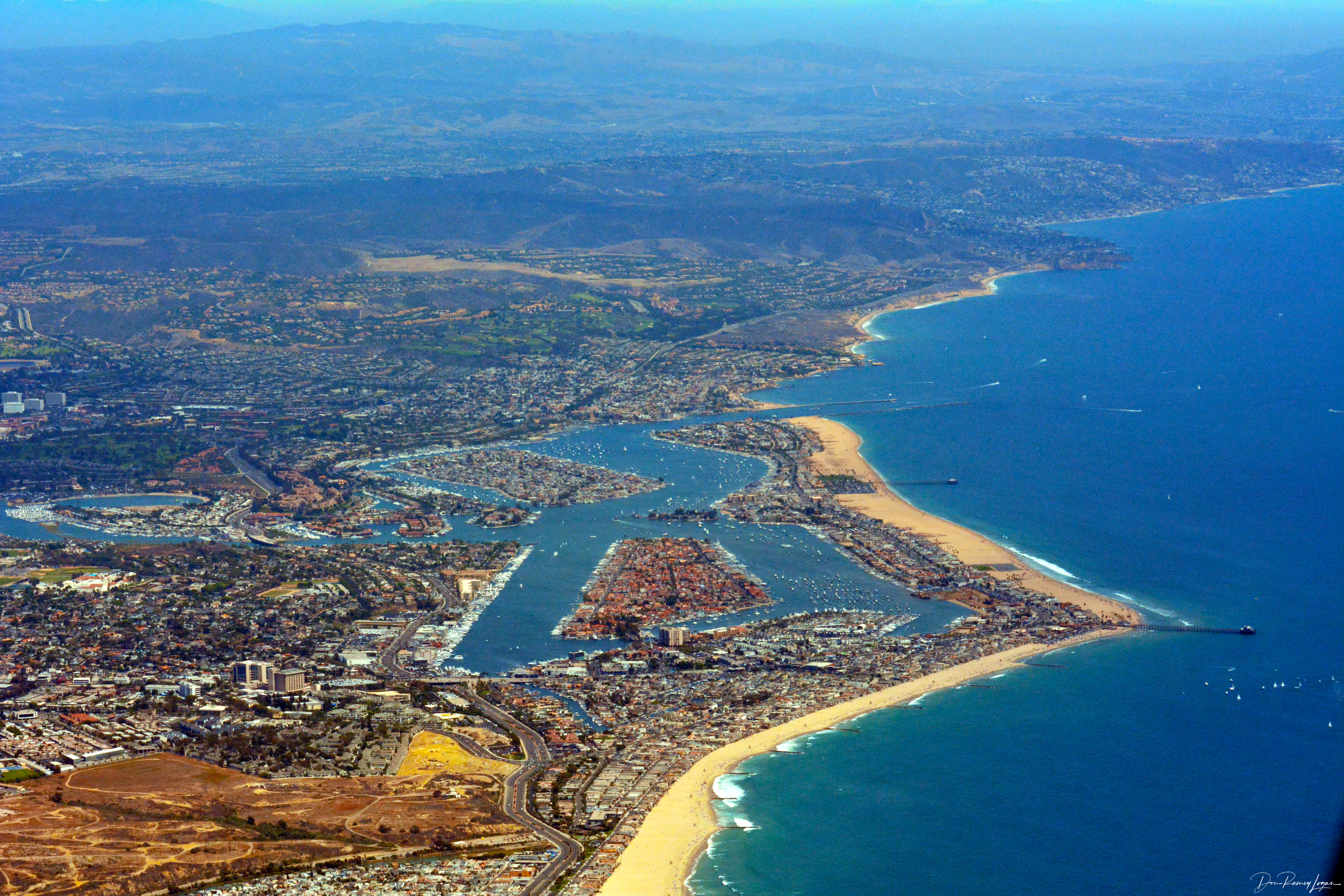
- Aerial view of Newport Beach in July 2014

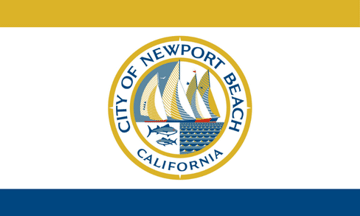
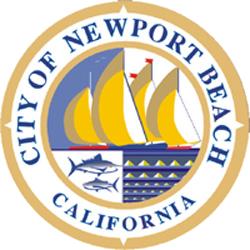
- Flag Seal
- Interactive map of Newport Beach, California
- Location in Southern California Location within California Location within the United States
- Coordinates: 33°37′0″N 117°53′51″W
- Country: United States
- State: California
- County: Orange
- Incorporated: September 1, 1906

Government
  - Type: Council-Manager
  - Body: Newport Beach City Council
  - Mayor: Lauren Kleiman
  - Mayor Pro Tem: Noah Von Blom
  - City Council: Joe Stapleton; Michelle Barto; Erik Weigand; Robyn Grant; Noah Blom; Lauren Kleiman; Sara J. Weber
  - City Manager: Seimone Jurjis
  - Assistant City Manager: Tara Finnigan

Area
  - Total: 52.92 sq mi (137.07 km^{2})
  - Land: 23.80 sq mi (61.63 km^{2})
  - Water: 29.13 sq mi (75.44 km^{2}) 55.04%
- Elevation: 9.8 ft (3 m)

Population (2020)
  - Total: 85,239
  - Rank: 103rd in California
  - Density: 3,582/sq mi (1,383/km^{2})
- Time zone: UTC−8 (Pacific)
  - Summer (DST): UTC−7 (PDT)
- ZIP Codes: 92657–92663
- Area code: 949
- FIPS code: 06-51182
- GNIS feature IDs: 1661104, 2411250
- Website: newportbeachca.gov
- Symbols of Newport Beach
- Flower: Bougainvillea
- Tree: Coral tree

Newport Beach is a coastal city in Orange County, California, United States. As of the 2020 census, Newport Beach had a population of 85,239. Located about 40 miles (64 km) southeast of downtown Los Angeles, Newport Beach is known for its sandy beaches. The city's harbor once supported maritime industries; today, it is used mostly for recreation. Balboa Island draws visitors with a waterfront path and easy access from the ferry to the shops and restaurants.

== History ==
The Upper Bay of Newport is a canyon carved by a stream in the Pleistocene period. The Lower Bay of Newport was formed much later by sand brought along by ocean currents, which constructed the offshore beach now recognized as the Balboa Peninsula of Newport Beach.

For thousands of years, the Tongva people lived on the land in an extensive, thriving community. The Tongva villages of Genga and Moyongna were located in Newport Beach. The Spanish Empire colonized the land, followed by Mexicans and Americans, all of whom displaced the Tongva.

The State of California sold 1-acre (0.40 ha)-plots of land for $1 apiece in the Newport area. Anglo-American inhabitation in the area grew substantially following 1870 when a 105-ton steamer named The Vaquero, captained by Captain Samuel S. Dunnells (against warnings posted by surveyors), safely steered through the lower and upper bay of Newport where it unloaded its cargo. James Irvine, upon hearing the astonishing news, quickly traveled from his home in San Francisco to the San Joaquin Ranch. Meeting in Irvine's ranch house near present-day UC Irvine with his brother Robert Irvine and friend James McFadden, they agreed that the newly found port should be simply named "Newport" which is where Newport Beach gets its name. James McFadden built a long McFadden Wharf in 1888, it became a shipping hub.

In 1905, city development increased when the Pacific Electric Railway established a southern terminus in Newport connecting the beach with downtown Los Angeles. In 1906 (with a population of 206 citizens), the scattered settlements were incorporated as the City of Newport Beach.

Settlements were filled in on the Peninsula, West Newport, Newport Island, Balboa Island, and Lido Isle. In 1923, Corona del Mar was annexed and in 2002, Newport Coast, East Santa Ana Heights, and San Joaquin Hills were annexed. In 2008, after a long battle with the city of Costa Mesa, Newport Beach annexed West Santa Ana Heights.

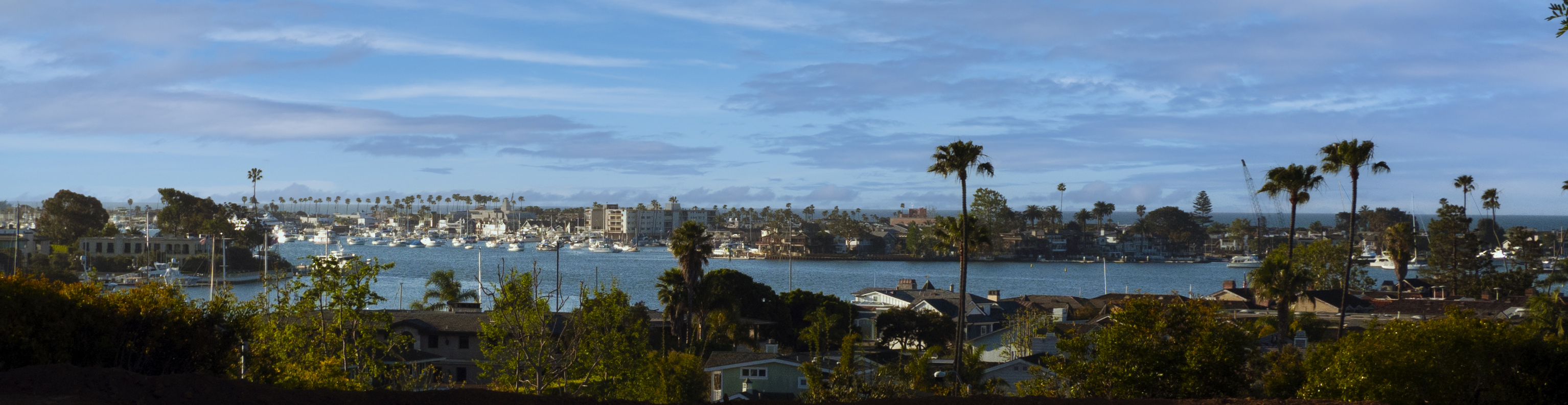
Newport Beach California

== Geography ==
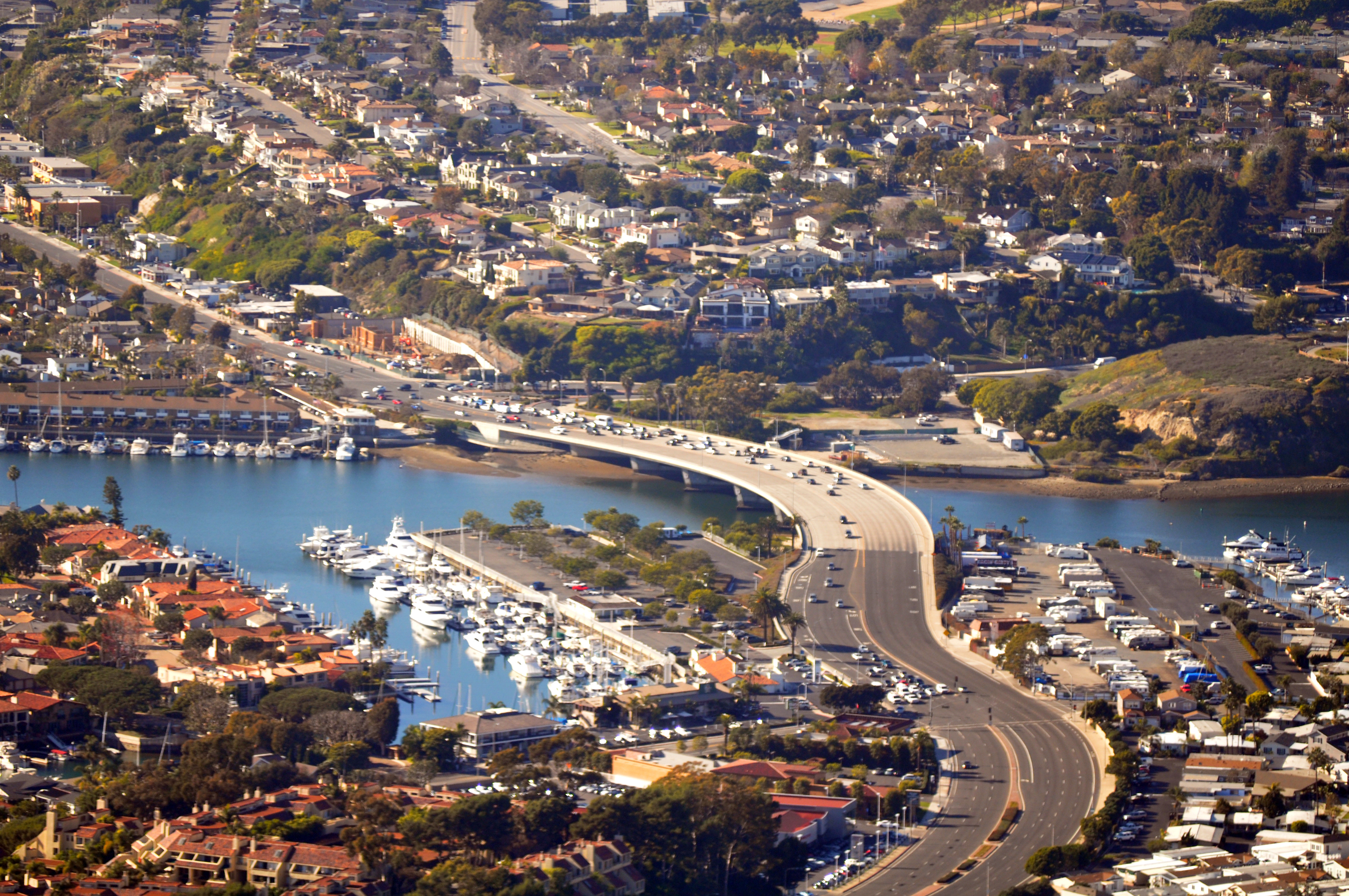
Dover and Pacific Coast Hwy in Newport Beach, California

Newport Beach extends in elevation from sea level to the 1,161 ft (354 m) summit of Signal Peak in the San Joaquin Hills, but the official elevation is 25 ft (7.6 m) above sea level at a location of 33°37′0″N 117°53′51″W (33.616671, −117.897604).

The city is bordered on the west by Huntington Beach at the Santa Ana River; on the north by Costa Mesa, John Wayne Airport, the City of Irvine and UC Irvine; and on the east by Crystal Cove State Park.

According to the United States Census Bureau, the city has a total area of 53.0 square miles (137 km^{2}), of which 23.8 square miles (62 km^{2}) is land and 29.2 square miles (76 km^{2}) (55.07%) is water.

Areas of Newport Beach include Corona del Mar, Balboa Island, Balboa Peninsula (also known as Balboa), Lido Peninsula, Newport Coast, San Joaquin Hills, Santa Ana Heights, and West Newport.

=== Newport Harbor and Newport Bay ===
Newport Beach California 2026

Newport Harbor is a semi-artificial harbor that was formed by dredging Newport Bay estuary during the early 1900s. Several artificial islands were built, which are now covered with private homes: Newport Island, Balboa Island, Little Balboa Island, Collins Island, Bay Island, Harbor Island, Lido Isle, and Linda Isle.

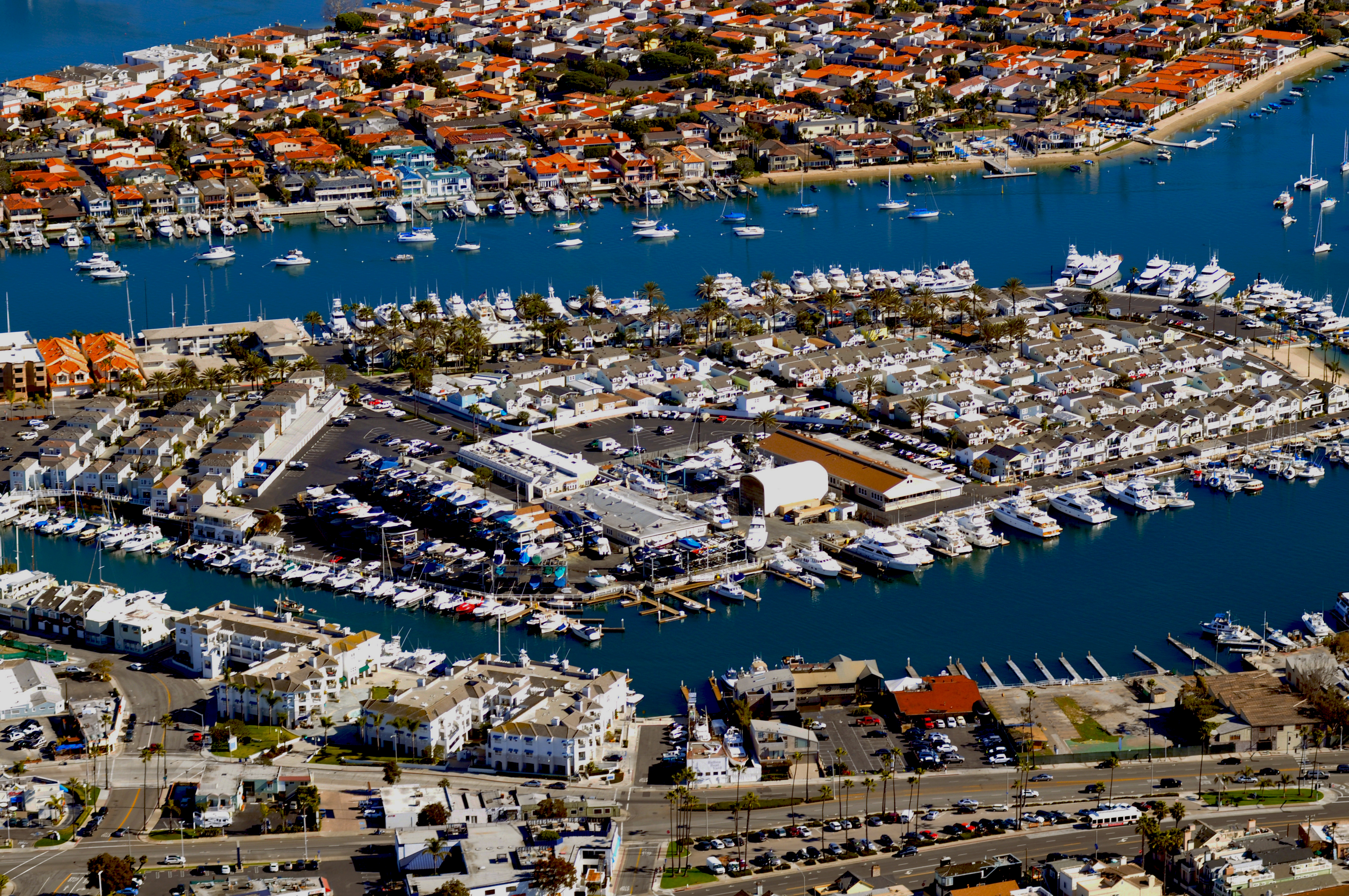
The Lido Peninsula

Newport Harbor once supported maritime industries such as boatbuilding, shipbuilding, and commercial fishing, but today it is used mostly for recreation. Its shores are occupied mostly by private homes and private docks. Newport Harbor has approximately 9,000 boats and is one of the largest recreational boat harbors on the U.S. west coast. It is a popular destination for all boating activities, including sailing, fishing, rowing, canoeing, kayaking, and paddleboarding.

Commercial maritime operations today include the Catalina Flyer ferry to Catalina Island, harbor tours, sport fishing, whale watching day trips, and charters as well as a few small commercial fishing boats.

Newport Bay is divided by the Pacific Coast Highway bridge, which is too low for most sailboats and very large boats to pass under. North of the bridge is referred to as Upper Newport Bay, or the Back Bay. South of the bridge is commonly called Lower Newport Bay, or Newport Harbor. However the Back Bay also has harbor facilities, especially the marina and launch ramp at Newport Dunes Marina.

The north end of the Newport Harbor channels surrounding Lido Isle has several small business centers and was at one time used as a home by the fishing fleets. On the North East side of the channel, the Lido Marina Village now acts as the local port to many "Newport Party Boats" that can be rented for events, as well as small merchants and local restaurants. It also hosts the area boat show each year. In 2014, the center was closed for a renovation. The Lido Village was reopened in 2017 after a complete renovation.

In 1927, a home was built at the mouth of the entrance of Newport Harbor that came to be known as the China House of China Cove. The home was built using traditional Chinese architecture. It was a landmark in the Newport Beach Harbor until it was demolished in the 1980s. Some of the original roof can be seen on a home located in the China Cove.

Upper Newport Bay is an estuary that was formed by a prehistoric flow of the Santa Ana River. Today it is fed by a small stream from San Diego Creek. Much of Upper Newport Bay is a protected natural area known as the Upper Newport Bay Ecological Reserve, established in 1975.

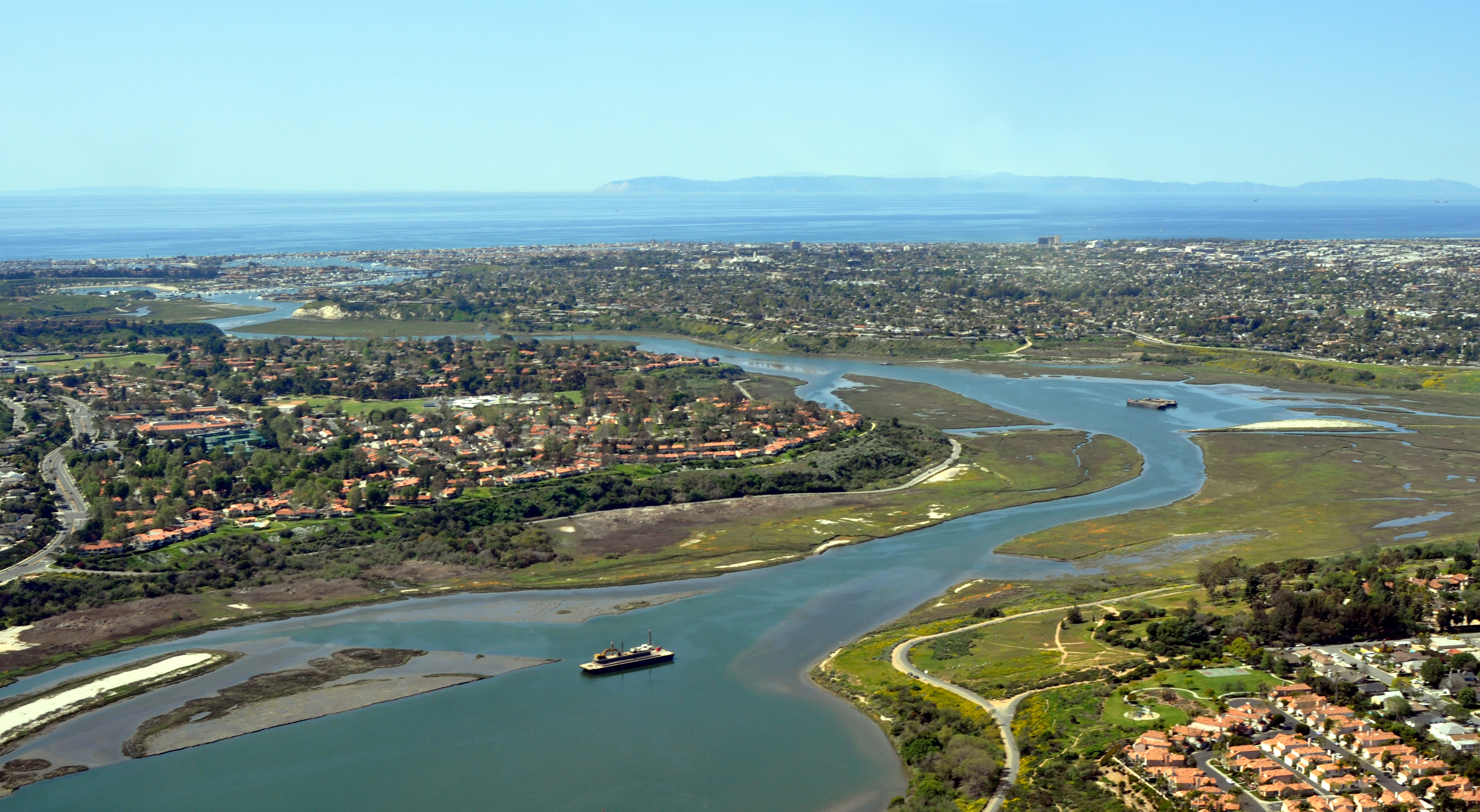
Newport Beach Back Bay

=== Climate ===
Newport Beach has a mid-latitude semi-arid climate (Köppen climate classification: BSk) with characteristics of a warm-summer Mediterranean climate (Köppen: Csb). Like many Los Angeles and Orange coastal cities, Newport Beach exhibits weak temperature variation, diurnally and seasonally, compared to inland cities even a few miles from the ocean. The Pacific Ocean greatly moderates Newport Beach's climate by warming winter temperatures and cooling summer temperatures. Diurnal temperature variation is stronger during the winter than during the summer. Newport Beach does not receive enough precipitation to qualify as a true Mediterranean climate.

Climate data for Newport Beach Harbor, California (1991–2020 normals, extremes 1921–present)
Month	Jan	Feb	Mar	Apr	May	Jun	Jul	Aug	Sep	Oct	Nov	Dec	Year
Record high °F (°C)	87 (31)	91 (33)	91 (33)	101 (38)	95 (35)	102 (39)	88 (31)	94 (34)	107 (42)	96 (36)	94 (34)	86 (30)	107 (42)
Mean maximum °F (°C)	76.4 (24.7)	73.8 (23.2)	74.1 (23.4)	76.1 (24.5)	74.4 (23.6)	74.4 (23.6)	77.1 (25.1)	79.2 (26.2)	82.0 (27.8)	83.0 (28.3)	80.4 (26.9)	74.5 (23.6)	77.1 (25.1)
Mean daily maximum °F (°C)	64.5 (18.1)	63.3 (17.4)	64.7 (18.2)	65.9 (18.8)	66.7 (19.3)	68.4 (20.2)	71.8 (22.1)	73.3 (22.9)	74.1 (23.4)	72.7 (22.6)	68.4 (20.2)	64.1 (17.8)	68.2 (20.1)
Daily mean °F (°C)	57.4 (14.1)	57.2 (14.0)	58.9 (14.9)	60.5 (15.8)	62.5 (16.9)	64.9 (18.3)	68.2 (20.1)	69.4 (20.8)	69.1 (20.6)	66.5 (19.2)	61.4 (16.3)	57.0 (13.9)	62.8 (17.1)
Mean daily minimum °F (°C)	50.4 (10.2)	51.0 (10.6)	53.1 (11.7)	55.1 (12.8)	58.3 (14.6)	61.5 (16.4)	64.6 (18.1)	65.5 (18.6)	64.1 (17.8)	60.2 (15.7)	54.5 (12.5)	49.8 (9.9)	57.3 (14.1)
Mean minimum °F (°C)	42.3 (5.7)	43.3 (6.3)	46.0 (7.8)	49.1 (9.5)	53.1 (11.7)	57.3 (14.1)	60.6 (15.9)	61.1 (16.2)	59.4 (15.2)	54.4 (12.4)	46.4 (8.0)	41.8 (5.4)	51.2 (10.7)
Record low °F (°C)	29 (−2)	31 (−1)	33 (1)	37 (3)	39 (4)	42 (6)	45 (7)	51 (11)	45 (7)	32 (0)	34 (1)	32 (0)	29 (−2)
Average precipitation inches (mm)	2.20 (56)	2.38 (60)	1.34 (34)	0.55 (14)	0.18 (4.6)	0.07 (1.8)	0.02 (0.51)	0.00 (0.00)	0.10 (2.5)	0.33 (8.4)	0.64 (16)	1.62 (41)	9.43 (240)
Average precipitation days	6.4	6.6	4.8	2.7	1.5	0.6	0.6	0.2	0.5	2.0	3.2	5.7	34.8
Mean monthly sunshine hours	217	226	279	300	279	270	341	341	270	248	210	217	3,198
Mean daily sunshine hours	7	8	9	10	9	9	11	11	9	8	7	7	8.75
Percentage possible sunshine	69	73	75	76	65	63	78	82	73	71	67	70	72
Average ultraviolet index	3	4	6	8	9	10	10	10	8	6	4	3	7
Source 1: National Oceanic and Atmospheric Administration
Source 2: En.tutiempo, Weather Atlas (sun and uv)

== Demographics ==
Historical population
Census	Pop.	Note	%±
1910	445		—
1920	894		100.9%
1930	2,203		146.4%
1940	4,438		101.5%
1950	12,120		173.1%
1960	26,564		119.2%
1970	49,582		86.7%
1980	62,556		26.2%
1990	66,643		6.5%
2000	70,032		5.1%
2010	85,186		21.6%
2020	85,239		0.1%
2024 (est.)	82,970	▼	−2.7%
U.S. Decennial Census; 1860–1870 1880–1890; 1900 1910 1920; 1930 1940 1950; 1960 1970 1980; 1990 2000 2010; 2020

Newport Beach first appeared as a city in the 1910 United States census.

=== Racial and ethnic composition ===
Newport Beach city, California – Racial and Ethnic Composition Note: the US Census treats Hispanic/Latino as an ethnic category. This table excludes Latinos from the racial categories and assigns them to a separate category. Hispanics/Latinos may be of any race.
Race / Ethnicity (NH = Non-Hispanic)	Pop 1980	Pop 1990	Pop 2000	Pop 2010	Pop 2020	% 1980	% 1990	% 2000	% 2010	% 2020
White alone (NH)	59,868	61,727	62,342	70,142	64,352	95.70%	92.62%	89.02%	82.34%	75.50%
Black or African American alone (NH)	117	215	354	571	626	0.19%	0.32%	0.51%	0.67%	0.73%
Native American or Alaska Native alone (NH)	177	148	137	152	100	0.28%	0.22%	0.20%	0.18%	0.12%
Asian alone (NH)	716	1,884	2,763	5,925	7,443	1.14%	2.83%	3.95%	6.96%	8.73%
Native Hawaiian or Pacific Islander alone (NH)	716	1,884	81	95	81	1.14%	2.83%	0.12%	0.11%	0.10%
Other race alone (NH)	52	21	93	165	417	0.08%	0.03%	0.13%	0.19%	0.49%
Mixed race or Multiracial (NH)	x	x	961	1,962	4,030	x	x	1.37%	2.30%	4.73%
Hispanic or Latino (any race)	1,626	2,648	3,301	6,174	8,190	2.60%	3.97%	4.71%	7.25%	9.61%
Total	62,556	66,643	70,032	85,186	85,239	100.00%	100.00%	100.00%	100.00%	100.00%

=== 2020 census ===
Newport Beach Channel Entrance 2018

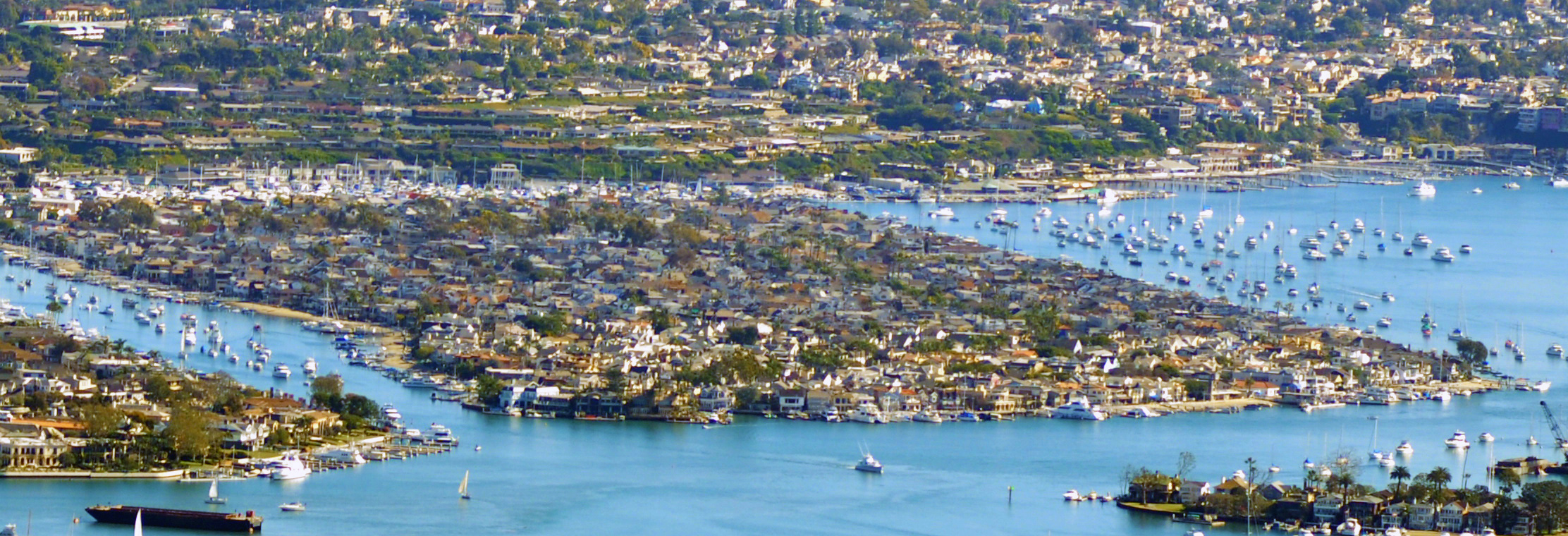
Balboa Island, Newport Beach California in January 2013

As of the 2020 census, Newport Beach had a population of 85,239 and a population density of 3,582.4 inhabitants per square mile (1,383.2/km^{2}). The racial makeup of the city was 78.2% White, 0.8% African American, 0.3% Native American, 8.8% Asian, 0.1% Pacific Islander, 2.7% from other races, and 9.1% from two or more races. Hispanic or Latino residents of any race were 9.6% of the population.

The census reported that 99.4% of the population lived in households, 0.3% lived in non-institutionalized group quarters, and 0.4% were institutionalized. Newport Beach's population was 100.0% urban and 0.0% rural.

There were 38,402 households, of which 20.3% had children under 18 living in them. Of all households, 45.2% were married-couple households, 6.0% were cohabiting couple households, 27.9% had a female householder with no partner present, and 20.9% had a male householder with no partner present. About 32.8% of households were one-person households, and 13.9% had one person aged 65 or older. The average household size was 2.21. There were 21,775 families (56.7% of all households).

The age distribution was 16.3% under age 18, 7.4% aged 18 to 24, 23.5% aged 25 to 44, 28.7% aged 45 to 64, and 24.1% aged 65 or older. The median age was 47.4 years. For every 100 females, there were 95.5 males, and for every 100 females age 18 and over, there were 94.1 males age 18 and over.

There were 45,016 housing units at an average density of 1,891.9 units per square mile (730.5 units/km^{2}). Of all housing units, 14.7% were vacant; the homeowner vacancy rate was 1.6% and the rental vacancy rate was 8.9%. Of the occupied units, 54.1% were owner-occupied and 45.9% were occupied by renters.

=== 2023 ACS estimates ===
In 2023, the US Census Bureau estimated that the median household income was $158,461, and the per capita income was $113,918. About 4.1% of families and 7.3% of the population were below the poverty line.

=== 2010 census ===
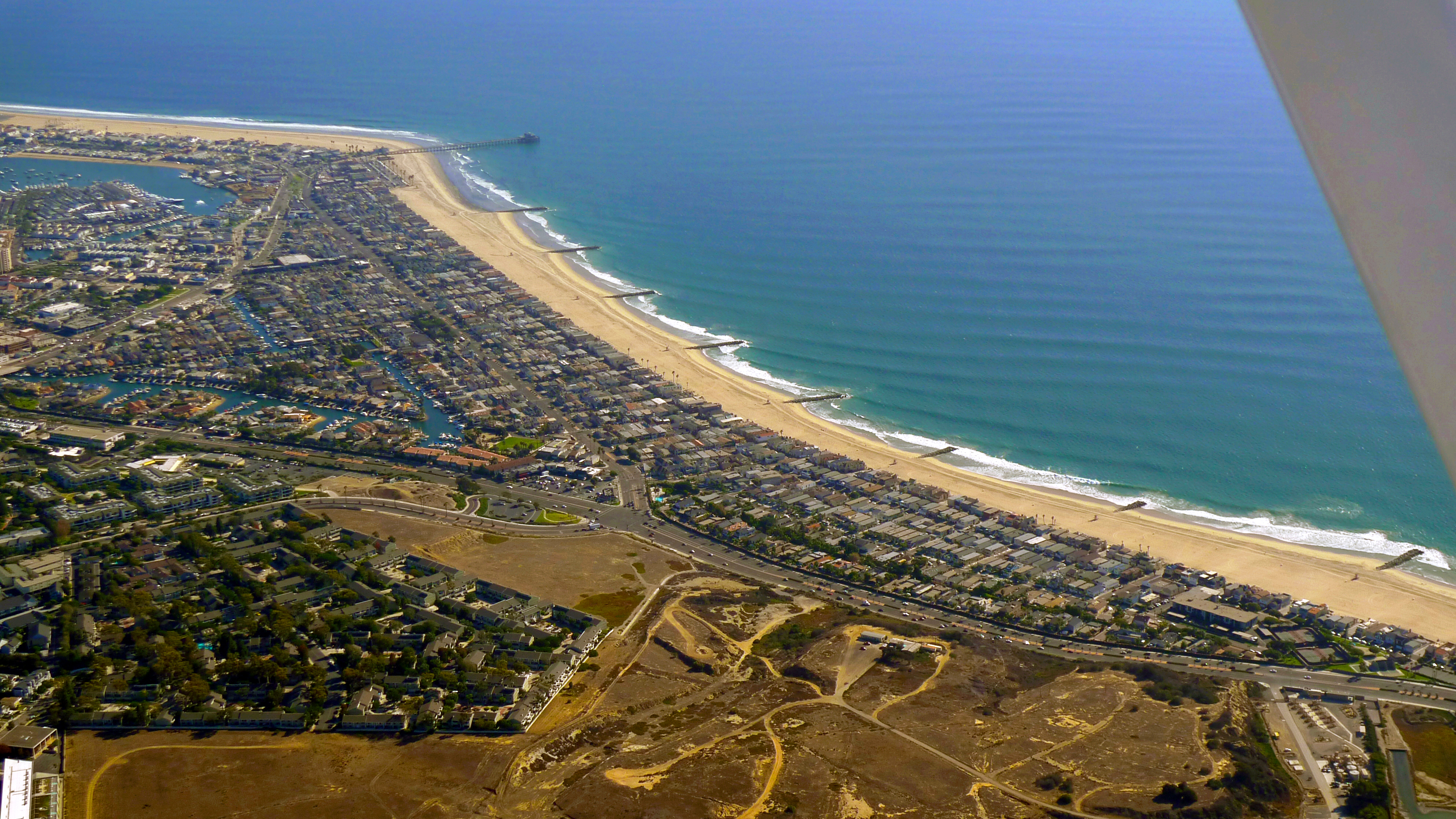
West Newport Beach

The 2010 United States census reported that Newport Beach had a population of 85,186. The population density was 3,587.5 inhabitants per square mile (1,385.1/km^{2}). The racial makeup of Newport Beach was 74,357 (87.3%) White (82.3% Non-Hispanic White), 616 (0.7%) African American, 223 (0.3%) Native American, 5,982 (7.0%) Asian, 114 (0.1%) Pacific Islander, 1,401 (1.6%) from other races, and 2,493 (2.9%) from two or more races. Hispanic or Latino of any race were 6,174 persons (7.2%).

The Census reported that 84,784 people (99.5% of the population) lived in households, 151 (0.2%) lived in non-institutionalized group quarters, and 251 (0.3%) were institutionalized.

There were 38,751 households, out of which 8,212 (21.2%) had children under the age of 18 living in them, 17,273 (44.6%) were opposite-sex married couples living together, 2,608 (6.7%) had a female householder with no husband present, 1,199 (3.1%) had a male householder with no wife present. There were 1,846 (4.8%) unmarried opposite-sex partnerships, and 233 (0.6%) same-sex married couples or partnerships. 12,838 households (33.1%) were individuals, and 4,412 (11.4%) had someone living alone who was 65 years or older. The average household size was 2.19. There were 21,080 families (54.4% of all households); the average family size was 2.81.

The population was different ages with 14,744 people (17.3%) under the age of 18, 6,659 people (7.8%) aged 18 to 24, 22,299 people (26.2%) aged 25 to 44, 25,322 people (29.7%) aged 45 to 64, and 16,162 people (19.0%) who were 65 years of age or older. The median age was 44.0 years. For every 100 females, there were 97.1 males. For every 100 females aged 18 and over, there were 95.5 males.

There were 44,193 housing units at an average density of 834.2 per square mile (322.1/km^{2}), of which 21,224 (54.8%) were owner-occupied, and 17,527 (45.2%) were occupied by renters. The homeowner vacancy rate was 1.7%; the rental vacancy rate was 7.8%. 50,511 people (59.3% of the population) lived in owner-occupied housing units, and 34,273 people (40.2%) lived in rental housing units.

=== 2009–2013 estimates ===
In 2009–2013, Newport Beach had a median household income of $106,333, with 7.9% of the population living below the federal poverty line.

== Economy ==
Housing prices in Newport Beach ranked eighth highest in the United States in a 2009 survey.

Newport Beach is home to one Fortune 500 company, insurer Pacific Life. Other companies based in Newport Beach include Acacia Research, Galardi Group (Wienerschnitzel), Chipotle Mexican Grill, The Original Hamburger Stand, Tastee-Freez, the Irvine Company, Jazz Semiconductor, PIMCO, and Urban Decay. Fletcher Jones Motor Cars in Newport Beach is the largest Mercedes-Benz dealership in the world. At one time Edwards Theatres had its headquarters in Newport Beach. Before its dissolution Air California was headquartered in Newport Beach. The city's largest law firm is Stradling Yocca Carlson & Rauth, with approximately 75 attorneys at its Fashion Island location. Toyota has a design center, Calty Design Research which is in Newport Beach and responsible for the exterior design of the 2nd, 5th, and 7th generation Celica, as well as some Lexus and Scion models.

=== Top employers ===
According to the city's 2021 Comprehensive Annual Financial Report here are the top employers in the city.

#	Employer	# of employees
1	Hoag Memorial Hospital Presbyterian	5,292
2	PIMCO	1,258
3	Pacific Life Insurance	1,250
4	Glidewell Dental	1,008
5	Irvine Management Company	895
6	Tower Semiconductor	868
7	Resort at Pelican Hill	798
8	Newport-Mesa Unified School District	780
9	City of Newport Beach	728
10	Fletcher Jones Motor Cars	465
11	Balboa Bay Club	427
12	Newport Beach Marriott Hotel & Tennis Club	371

== Arts and culture ==
=== Points of interest ===
- Newport Back Bay or Upper Newport Bay
- Newport Pier
- Balboa Pier
- Balboa Fun Zone
- Balboa Island Ferry
- Balboa Island
- Mariners Medical Arts complex on Westcliff Drive designed by Richard Neutra in 1963
- Bunnyhenge
- Sherman Library and Gardens
- Newport Sports Museum
- Pacific Coast Highway
- Orange County Council BSA Sea Base
- The Crab Cooker
- Corona del Mar State Beach
- Crystal Cove State Park
- The Wedge (surfing)
- Lovell Beach House
- Wooden Boat Festival
Newport Beach Pier

Newport Center

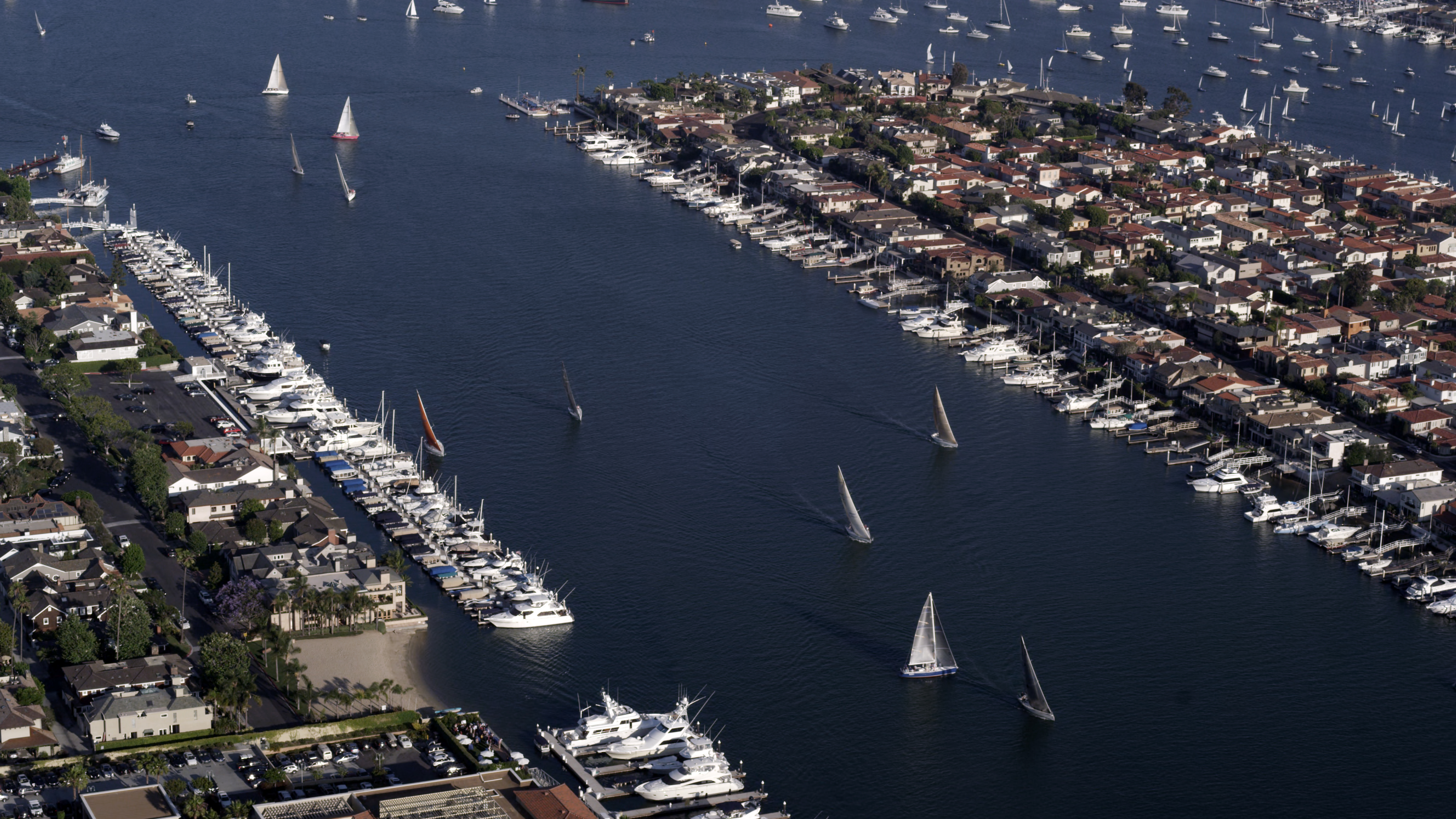
Beer Can Races in Newport Beach

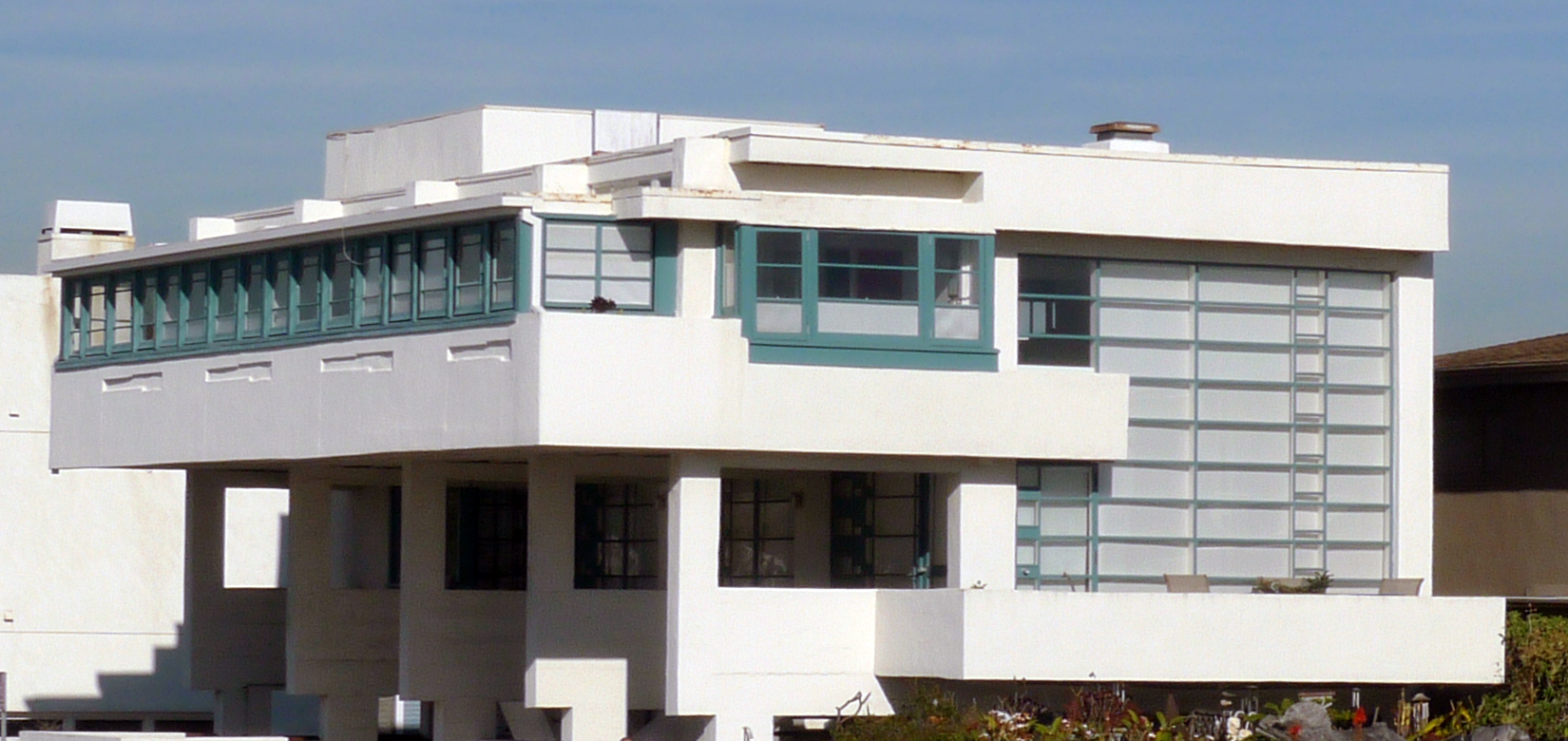
Lovell Beach House

Cannery

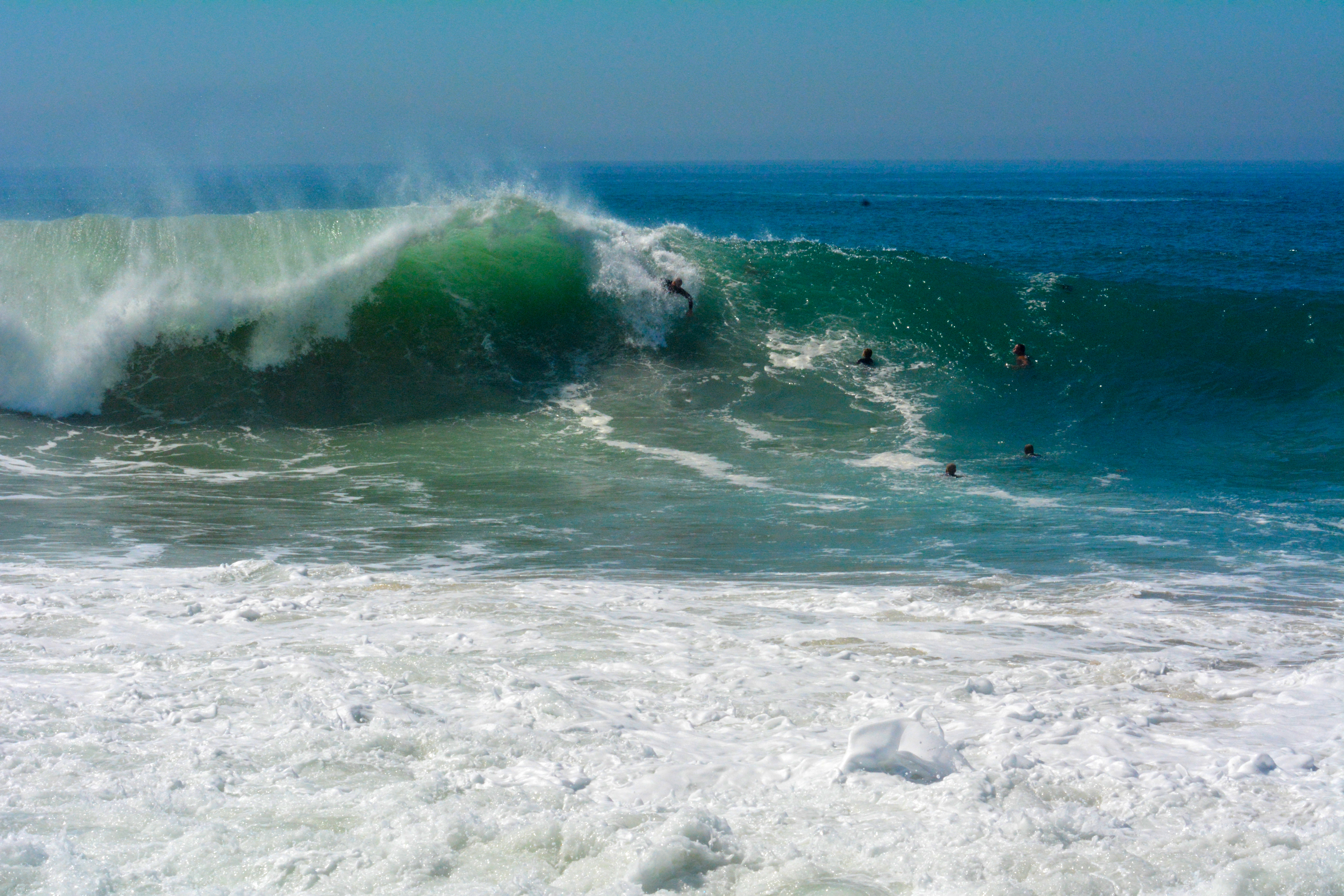
The Wedge (surfing)

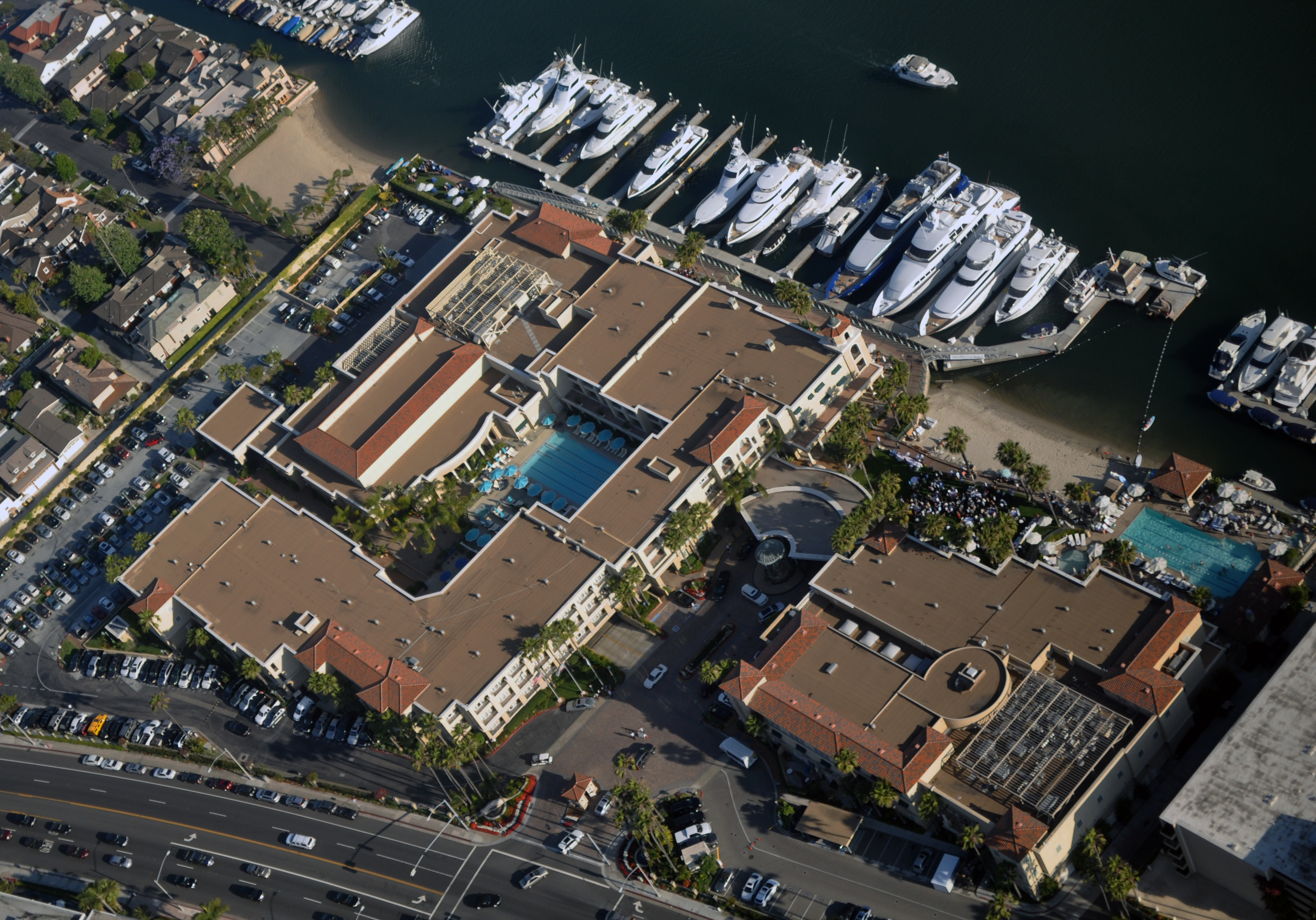
Balboa Bay Resort

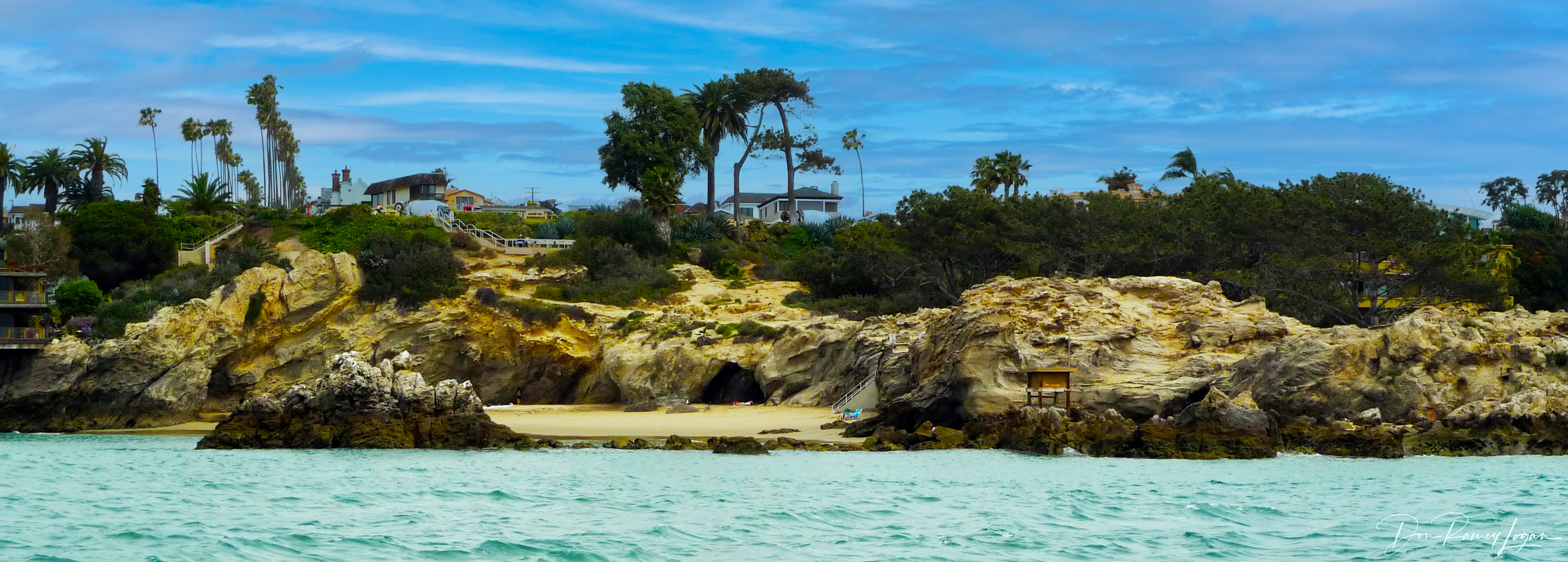
Pirate's Cove Beach

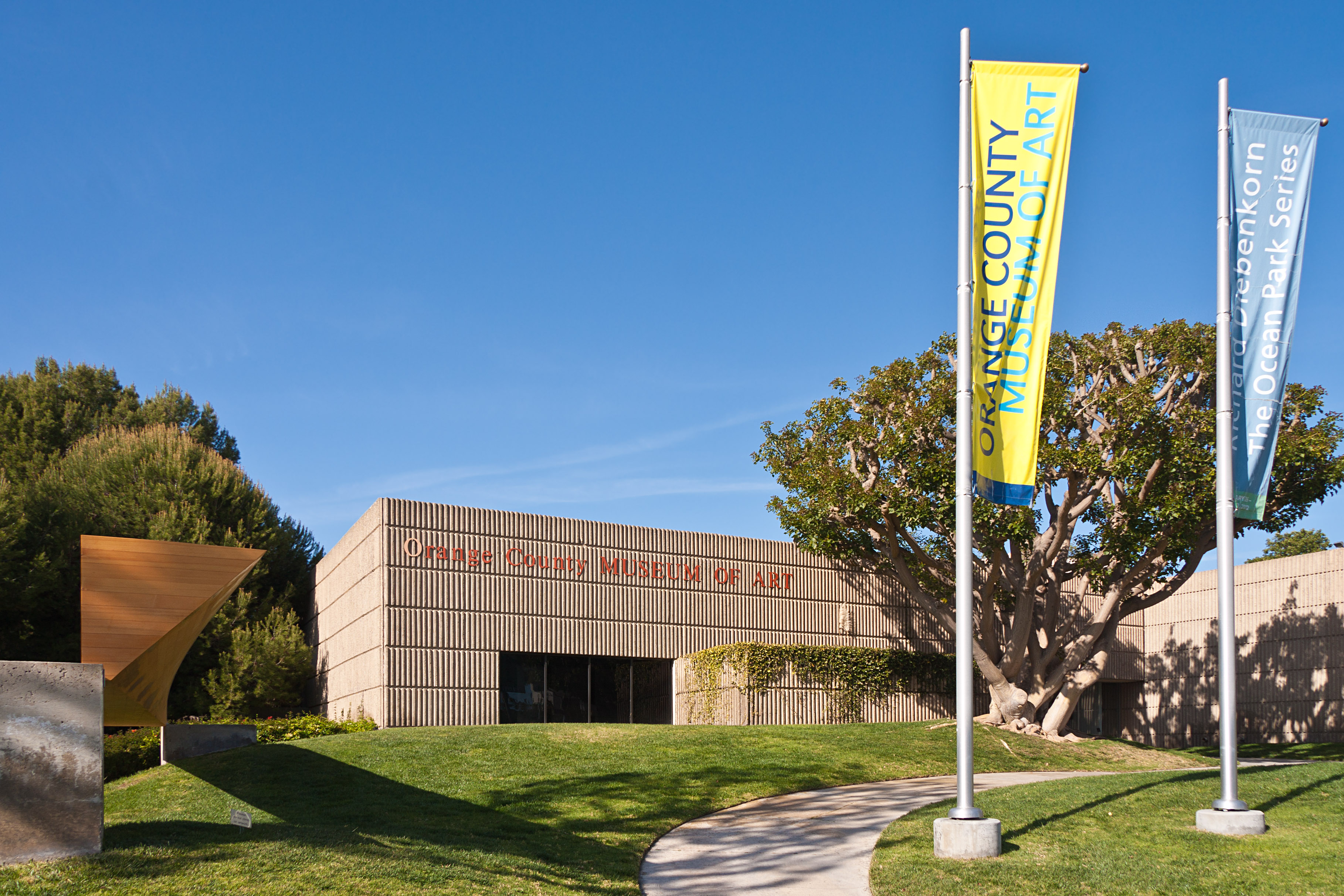
Orange County Museum of Art

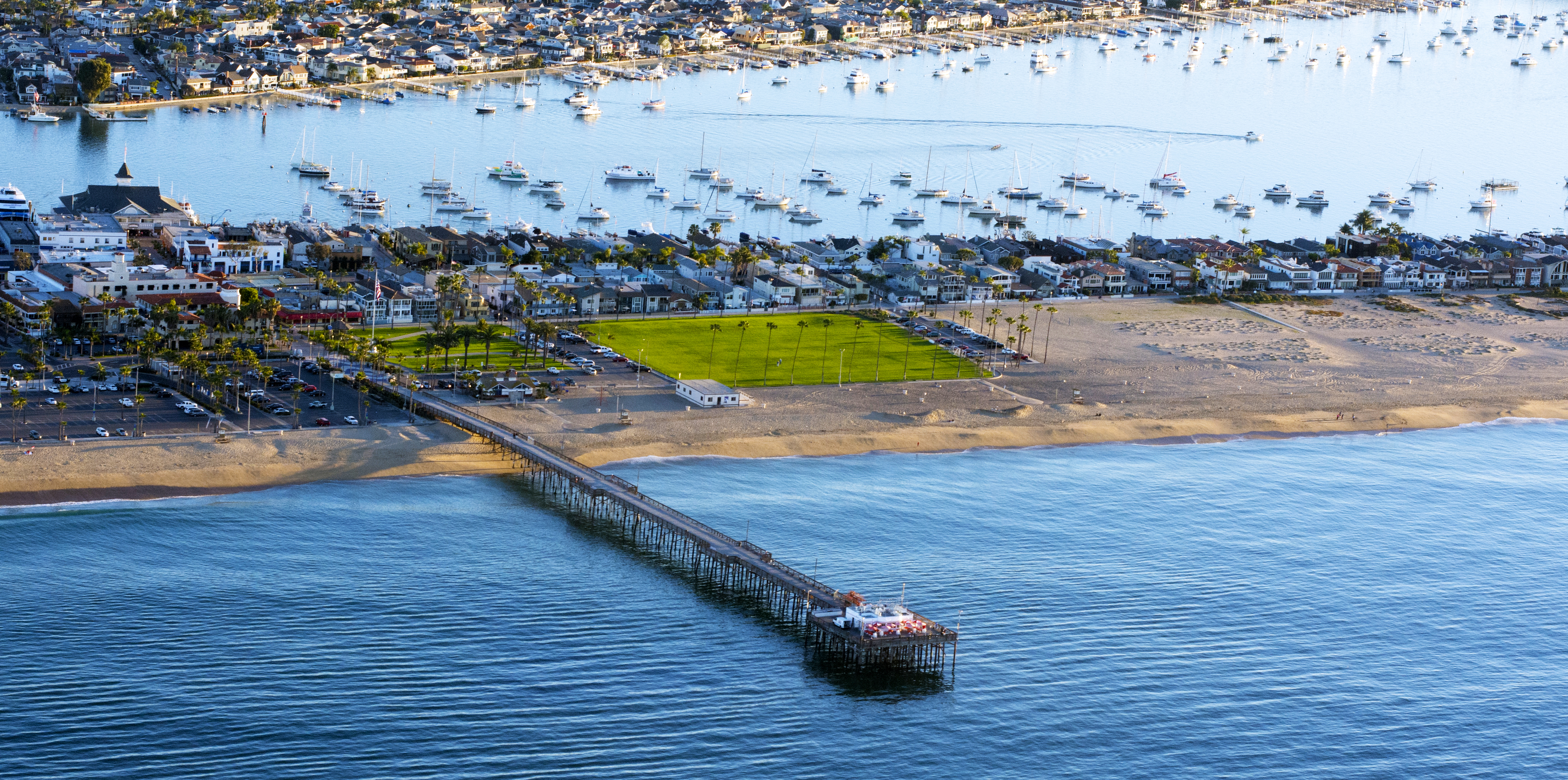
Newport Beach Feb 14 2015

The Grand Canal

Ohhh oh "China Cove"

=== Past landmarks ===
- The China House of China Cove
- Orange County Museum of Art
- The Reuben E. Lee
- Rendezvous Ballroom
- The Banana Stand
- Balboa Inn
- Hall House

=== Attractions ===
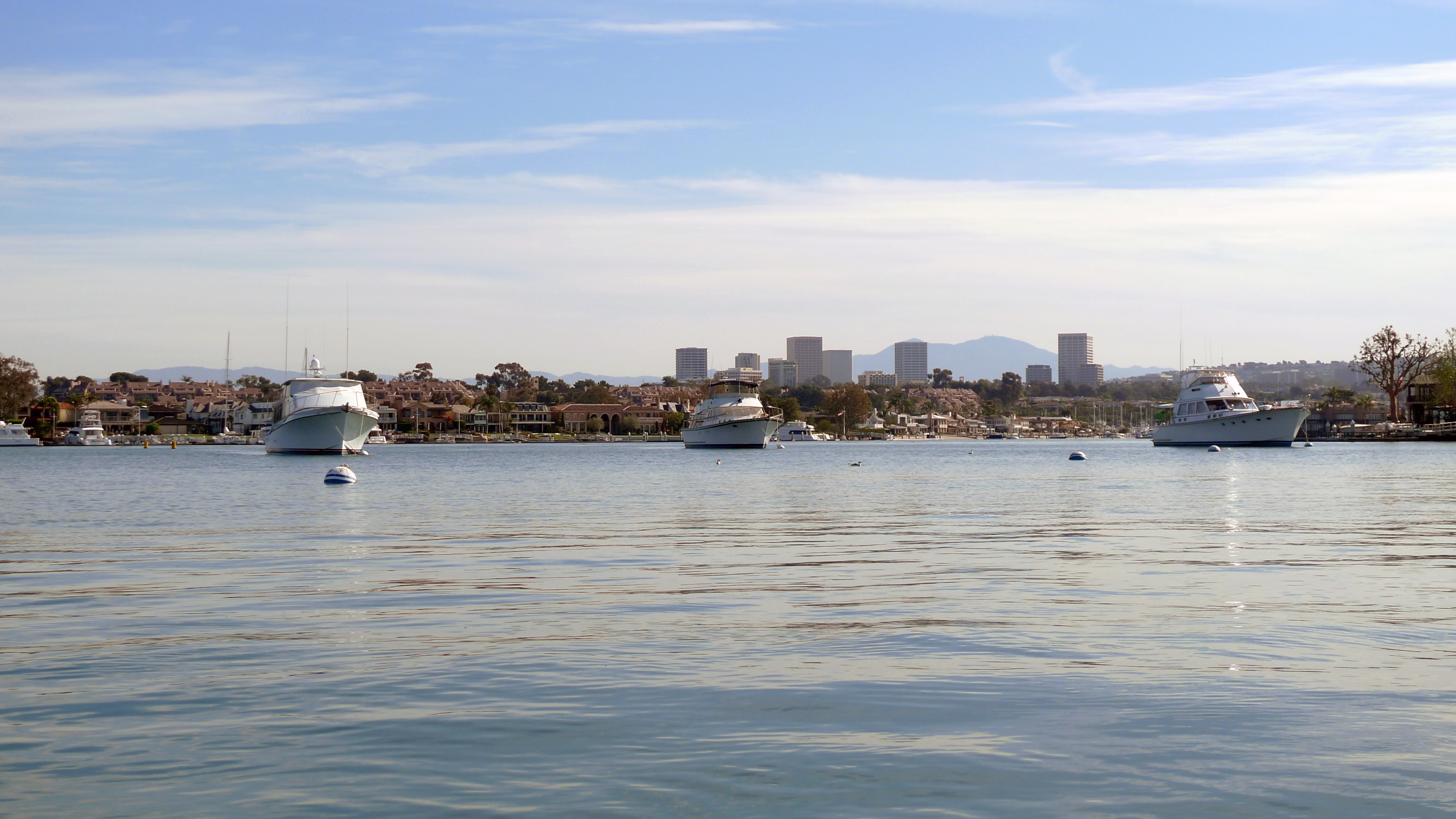
Newport Harbor

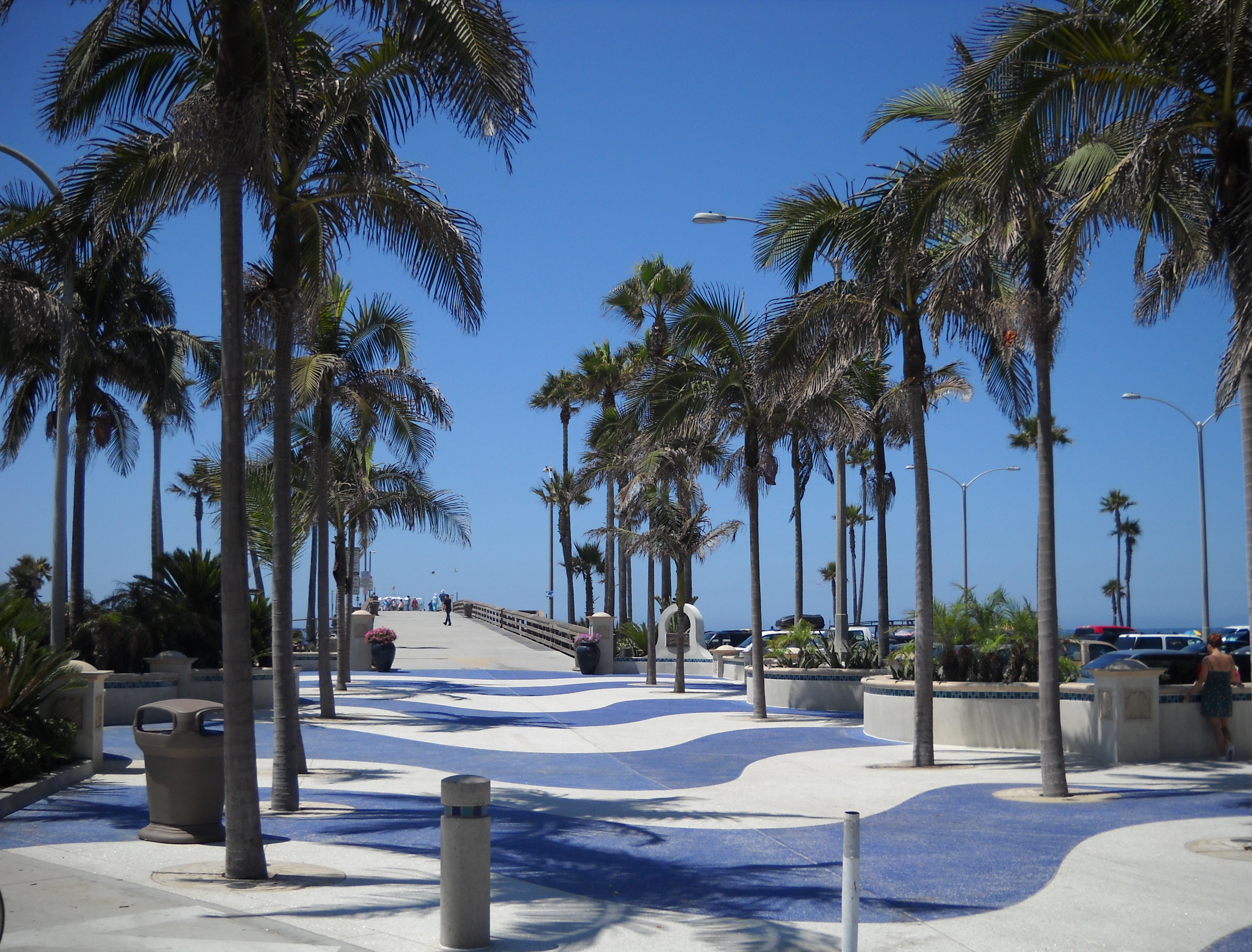
Balboa Pier

==== Beaches and surfing ====
Beachgoers have flocked to Newport Beach since the Pacific Electric Railway began bringing them in 1905. Attractions include the city beaches from the Santa Ana River to the tip of the Balboa Peninsula, Corona del Mar State Beach, and the beaches at Crystal Cove State Park. Newport Beach is known for good surfing, especially between Newport Pier and the Santa Ana River. At the tip of the Balboa Peninsula, The Wedge offers world-class bodyboarding and bodysurfing. Newport Pier and Balboa Pier draw fishermen and sightseers. A boardwalk runs 2.9 miles (4.7 km) from 36th Street in West Newport, past Newport Pier and Balboa Pier, to between E and F Streets on the Balboa Peninsula for both pedestrians and bikers.

A notable urban development project is proposed in Newport Beach, which involves converting a portion of a local golf course into a surf lagoon. The Newport Beach Surfing Lagoon Project, initiated by Back Bay Barrels LLC, involves the creation of a 7-acre lagoon capable of generating waves mechanically, along with two buildings intended for dining, retail, fitness, and lodging. The project has sparked debate among residents, with some viewing it as a progressive innovation and others as a potential disruption to the area's natural beauty and community character.

==== Harbor and boating ====
Newport Harbor is the largest recreational boat harbor on the U.S. west coast, and a popular destination for all boating activities, including sailing, fishing, rowing, kayaking, and paddleboarding.

The annual Christmas Boat Parade started in 1908.

Competitive sailing, rowing, and paddling events are common. The annual Newport to Ensenada International Yacht Race is the largest sailboat race in the world.

Boating activities are organized by five private yacht clubs, along with Orange Coast College, UC Irvine, and the Sea Scouts, all of which have sailing, rowing, and water activity bases on the harbor. The Newport Aquatic Center allows public participation in competitive rowing, canoeing, kayaking, and outrigger canoe racing. The Orange Coast College School of Sailing and Seamanship offers recreational and professional sailing and mariners' courses and certifications, including United States Coast Guard licensing. Weekly races take place during the summer including the Beer Can Races.

===== Nautical clubs =====
- Newport Harbor Yacht Club
- Balboa Yacht Club
- Bahia Corinthian Yacht Club
- Lido Isle Yacht Club

==== Balboa ====
The historic Balboa Pavilion and Balboa Island Ferry are on the Balboa Peninsula and Balboa's most famous landmarks. The 500-passenger Catalina Flyer is adjacent to the Pavilion and provides daily transportation to and from Avalon, located on Santa Catalina Island. The Balboa Fun Zone is also home to the Newport Harbor Nautical Museum.

Balboa Island village draws many visitors. A waterfront path around the island attracts walkers and joggers and provides easy access from the ferry to the shops and restaurants.

=== Media ===
- Newport Beach Independent (newspaper)
- Newport Beach (magazine)

=== Culture and nightlife ===
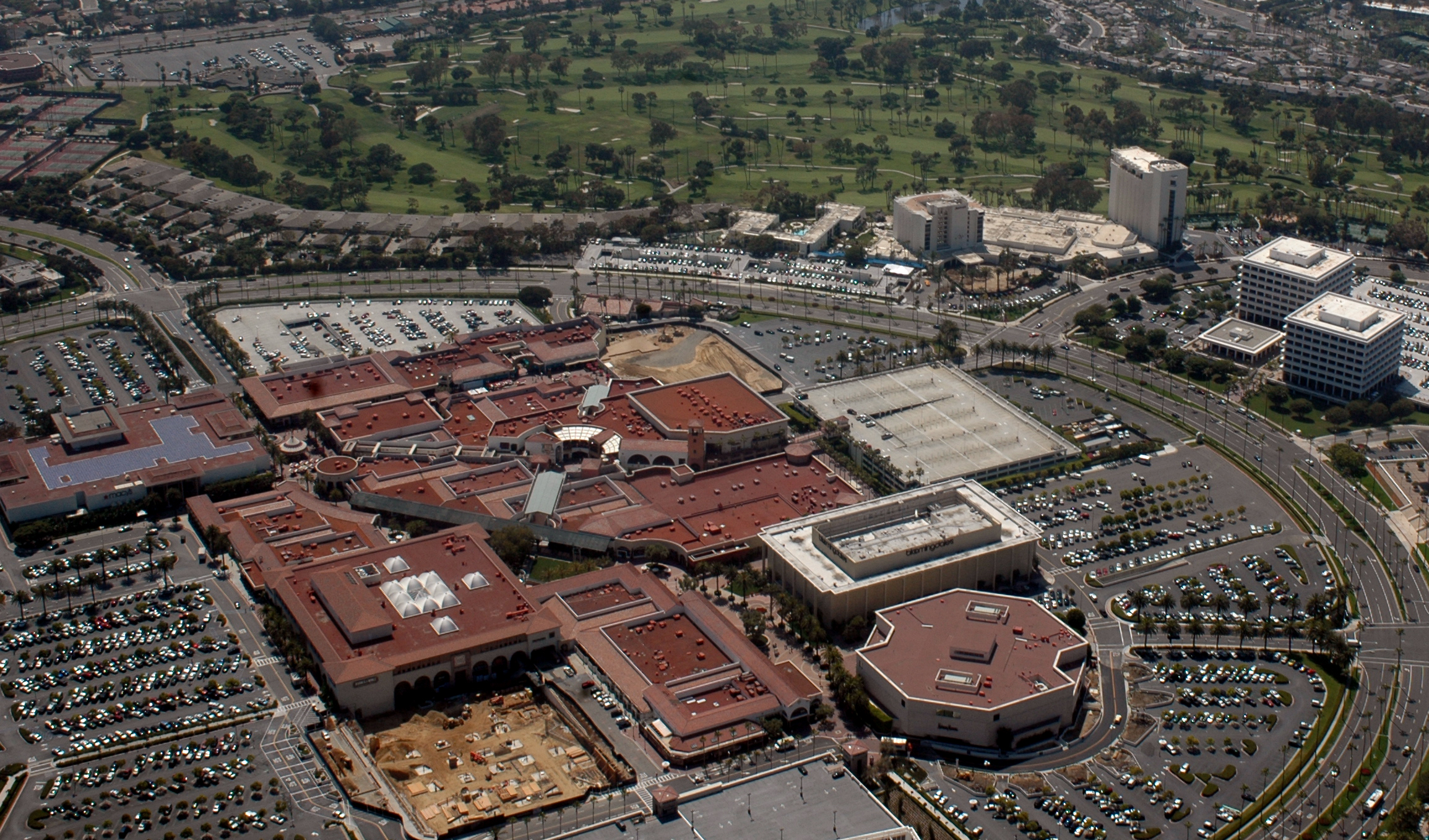
Fashion Island in Newport Center

Fashion Island at Newport Center is a regional shopping and entertainment destination.

Dining in Newport Beach tends to focus on seafood restaurants.

== Parks and recreation ==
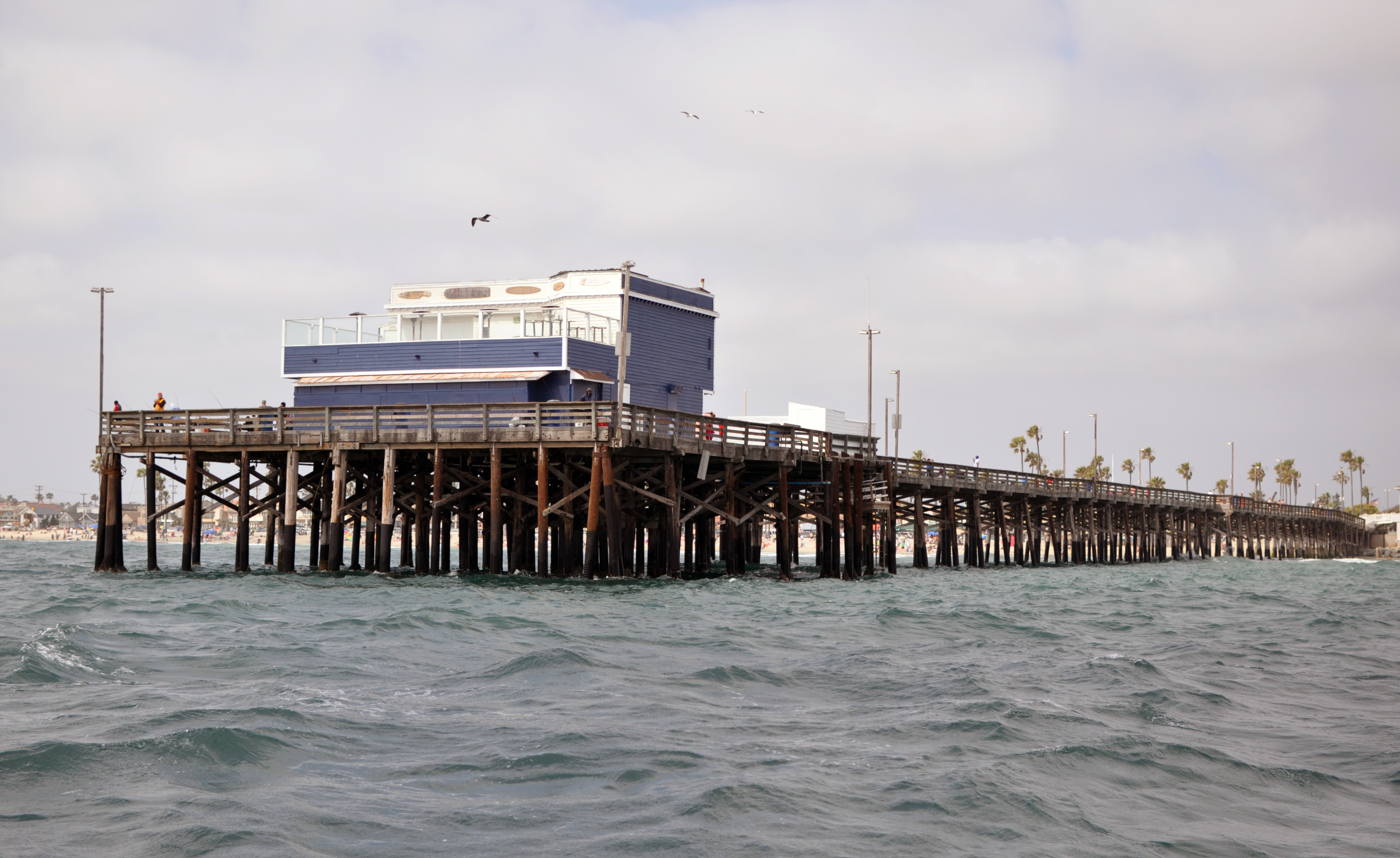
Fishing on the Newport Beach Pier

Upper Newport Bay, or the Back Bay, is ringed by Back Bay Drive and a network of trails and paths that attract bicyclists, rollerbladers, joggers, and walkers. Bird watchers and nature lovers are drawn to the Upper Newport Bay Ecological Reserve and Peter and Mary Muth Interpretive Center; and Crystal Cove State Park features tide pools at its beach, with backcountry hiking and mountain biking trails. Camping is available at Crystal Cove State Park and at the Newport Dunes Waterfront Resort and Marina. Whale watching is also popular in the area, with both scheduled and charter boats leaving directly from Newport Harbor. Whales and dolphins can often be seen from the Balboa and Newport Piers, as well as the shoreline during migration season.

Fishing is also extremely popular in Newport Bay, off the coast of Newport, and along the Newport Bay Jetty. Within the bay, there are multiple locations to purchase bait for dockside or spearfishing convenience. There are about 80 fishable species located in Newport Bay. A few of the most commonly fished species include the Gray Smoothhound Shark, Leopard Shark, Round Stingray, Shovelnose Guitarfish, Pacific Staghorn Sculpin, Silvery Mullet, Top-smelt, California Halibut, Spotted Sand Bass, Yellowfin Croaker, Bat Ray, Thornback Ray, Diamond Turbot, Shiner Surfperch, Corbina, Opaleye, Pile Surfperch, and Red Shiner. Commercial fishing is also prominent in offshore Newport Beach and Newport Bay. Lobsters are commonly fished in the reefs. However, the bright orange Garibaldi fish found offshore is a protected species.

On dark nights intense occurrences of bioluminescence can be observed when waves splash into the shore or when marine animals leave glowing traces in their wake.

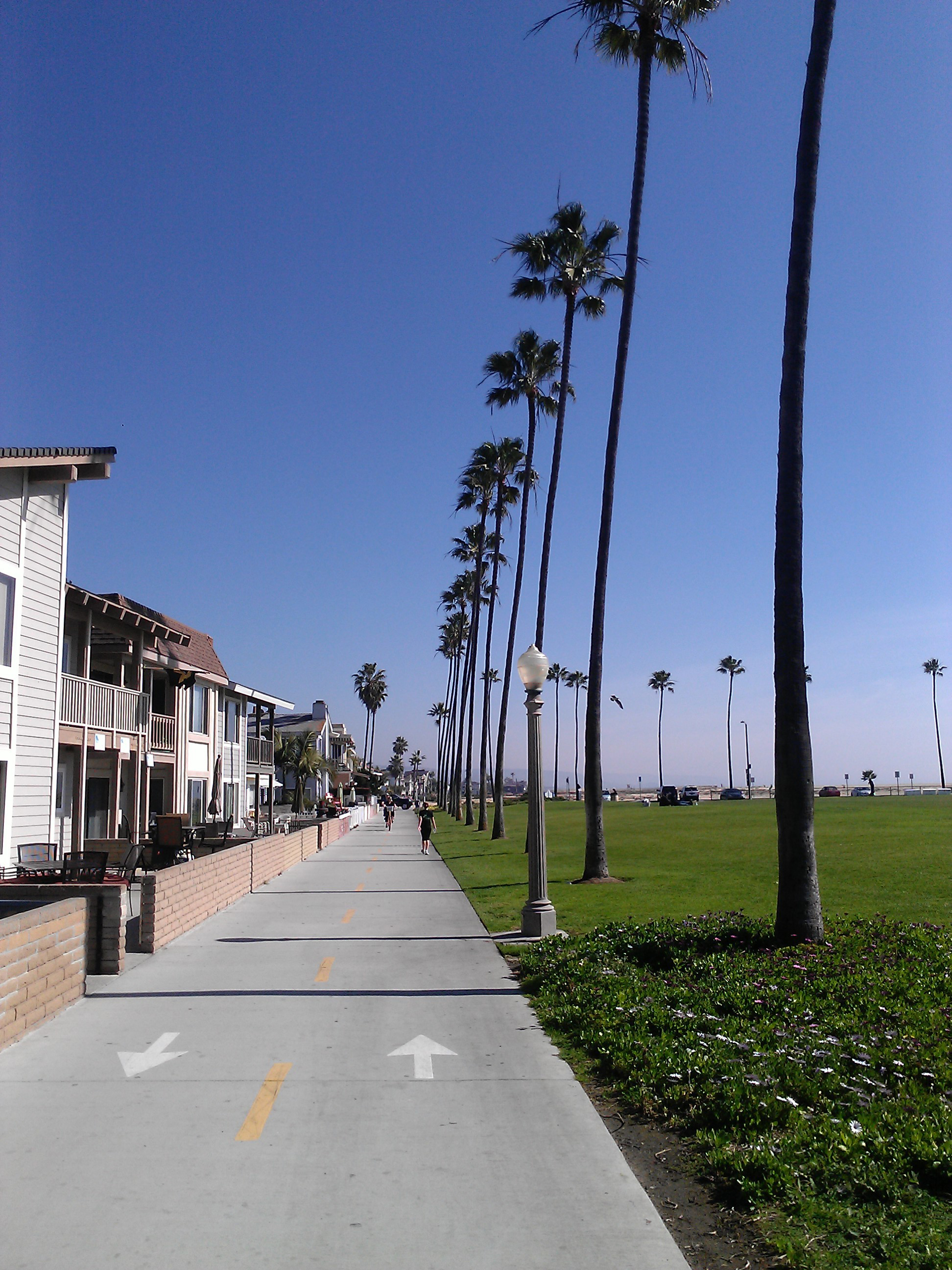
Newport Beach Boardwalk

=== Golf ===
The Pelican Hill area has two golf courses that rank among Golf Digest America's 100 Greatest Public Golf Courses.

== Government ==
=== Municipal ===
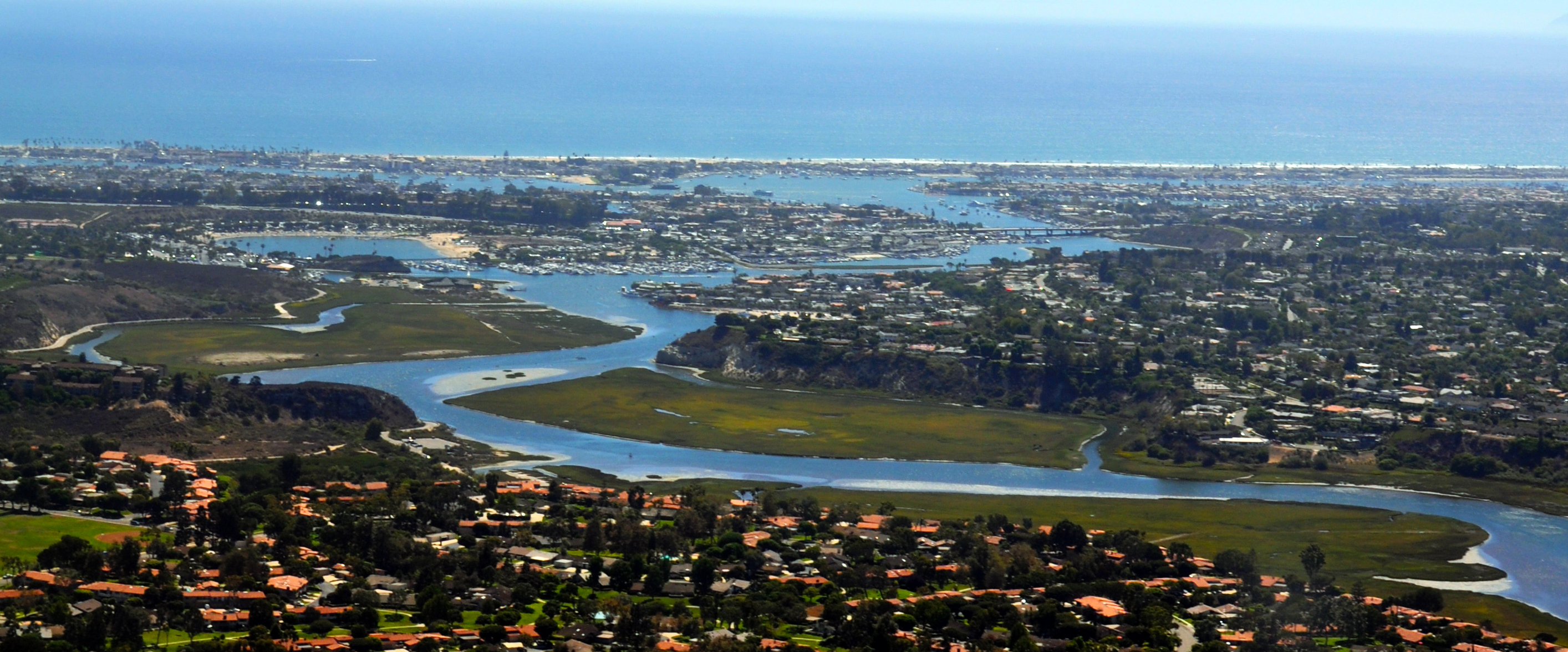
Upper Newport Bay

The City of Newport Beach was incorporated on September 1, 1906 and adopted its charter on January 7, 1955. The city implements a council–manager form of government, directed by a seven-member council who reside in specific geographic districts, but are elected at-large. Council elections take place in even-numbered years, and council members serve four-year terms. The mayor is chosen annually by the city council.

Until 1927 the city's governing body was known as a board of trustees with a president as its head. An act of the Legislature in 1927 changed the board to City Council with a mayor as the head.

=== State and federal representation ===
In the California State Legislature, Newport Beach is in the 36th senatorial district, represented by Republican Tony Strickland, and in the 72nd Assembly district, represented by Republican Diane Dixon.

In the United States House of Representatives, Newport Beach is in California's 47th congressional district, represented by Democrat Dave Min.

=== Voting history ===
Newport Beach has supported Republican candidates for president consistently since at least 1964.

As of February 2020, the California Secretary of State reported that Newport Beach had 57,408 registered voters; of those, 14,097 (24.56% vs. 35.63% in Orange County) are registered Democrats, 27,472 (47.85% vs. 34.16% in Orange County) are registered Republicans, 12,996 (22.64% vs. 25.29% in Orange County) have stated no political party preference, and 2,843 (4.95% vs. 4.92% in Orange County) are registered with a third party. According to a March 2018 report by the Sacramento Bee, Newport Beach has the second highest percentage of conservative voters among large cities in California.

The Republican candidate exceeded 70% of the vote in Newport Beach in all seven presidential elections from 1964 to 1988.

Although the politics of California have trended in favor of the Democratic Party, Newport Beach has remained Republican but has become less Republican over time. In 2016, as Donald Trump became the first GOP presidential candidate to lose Orange County since Alf Landon in 1936, Trump won Newport Beach by a margin of 14 points. Trump also won Newport Beach by a margin of nearly ten points in the 2020 election, and nearly 17 points in 2024.

Newport Beach city vote by party in presidential elections
Year	Democratic	Republican	Third Parties
2024	40.22% 19,937	57.11% 28,309	2.66% 1,320
2020	44.14% 24,111	53.97% 29,477	1.89% 1,030
2016	40.15% 18,073	54.34% 24,460	5.51% 2,478
2012	32.31% 15,152	65.76% 30,842	1.94% 908
2008	40.55% 19,479	57.81% 27,767	1.64% 788
2004	33.72% 15,632	65.24% 30,240	1.04% 483
2000	30.86% 11,647	65.89% 24,865	3.25% 1,228
1996	28.71% 10,076	62.47% 21,921	8.81% 3,093
1992	26.34% 10,874	49.09% 20,262	24.57% 10,140
1988	24.02% 9,080	74.97% 28,344	1.01% 381
1984	19.72% 6,605	79.11% 26,492	1.16% 389
1980	15.98% 5,151	74.10% 23,882	9.91% 3,195
1976	23.51% 6,870	74.98% 21,910	1.51% 441
1972	24.14% 7,297	72.47% 21,908	3.39% 1,026
1968	19.96% 4,249	77.09% 16,410	2.95% 627
1964	26.57% 4,623	73.43% 12,775

== Education ==
- Newport Elementary School
- Corona del Mar High School
- Newport Harbor High School
- Sage Hill School
- Pacifica Christian High School
- Carden Hall
- Eastbluff Elementary School
- Ensign Intermediate School
- Harbor Day School
- Harbor View Elementary School
- Lincoln Elementary School
- Mariners Elementary School
- Newport Heights Elementary School
- Newport Coast Elementary School
- Our Lady Queen of Angels School
- Roy O. Andersen Elementary School

== Infrastructure ==
=== Fire department ===
The Newport Beach Fire Department is the agency that provides fire protection, lifeguard coverage, and emergency medical services.

Newport Beach has 8 fire stations spread across the city, as well as a Lifeguard Headquarters at the base of the Newport Pier.

=== Marine operations ===
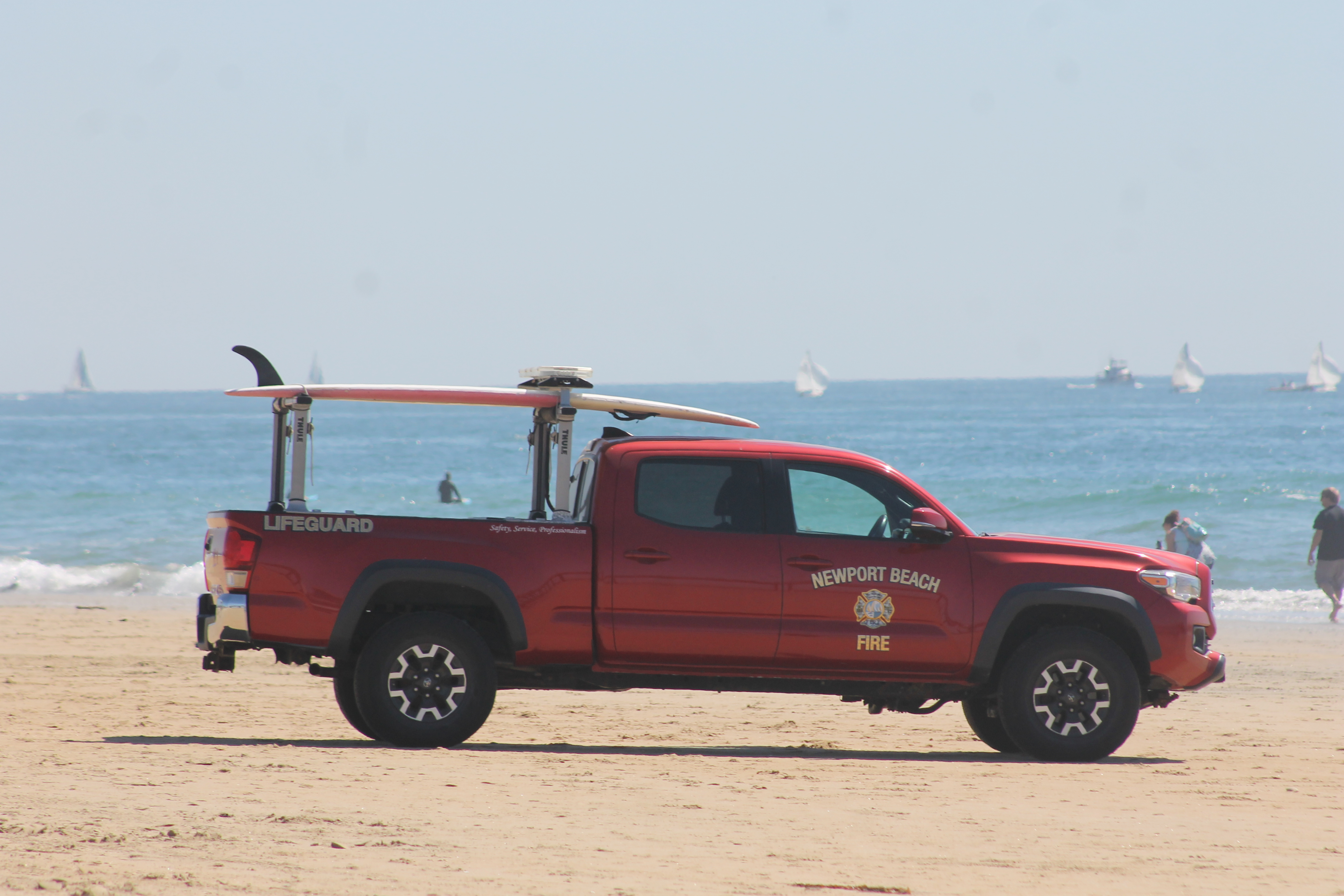
Toyota Tacoma in service with the NBFD Lifeguard

The marine division of the NBFD is responsible for lifeguarding the nearly 10 million annual visitors to Newport Beach's 6.2 miles (10.0 km) of ocean and 2.5 miles (4.0 km) of bay beaches. In 2013 alone the marine division performed 3,811 water rescues. Newport Beach lifeguards are recognized as the top agency in the nation, considering their relatively small size. They are also recognized as an advanced agency by the United States Lifesaving Association.

Newport Beach lifeguards also hold an annual summer Junior Lifeguard program which is one of the nation's largest and oldest. The Junior Lifeguard program works closely with the John Wayne Cancer Foundation to spread skin cancer awareness.

Included in their area is The Wedge, a spot located at the extreme east end of the Balboa Peninsula that is known for its large wedge-shaped waves, which make it a popular spot for skimboarding, surfing, bodyboarding, and bodysurfing. During south or south/southwest swells of the right size and aligned in the swell window, the Wedge can produce huge waves up to 30 feet (9.1 m) high. Newport Beach has one of the most diverse coastlines in the world, spanning over 6 miles (9.7 km). For this reason the NBFD Marine Operations Division requires its ocean lifeguards to be in top shape and to have years of local ocean experience.

== In popular culture ==
The city has figured into several television shows and movies:

- The music video for Childish Gambino's "3005" was filmed on the Ferris Wheel at the Balboa Fun Zone.
- MTV replaced its hit teen-reality series Laguna Beach: The Real Orange County with a new show, Newport Harbor: The Real Orange County, on August 15, 2007. Only the cast and location changed in the new series which was based on the lives of high school students living in Newport Beach.
- Several scenes from the Disney Channel movie The Thirteenth Year were filmed at the Balboa Pavilion in 1999.
- The exterior of the Newport Beach Central Library appeared as the reunion venue in the 1997 film Romy and Michele's High School Reunion.
- The music video for "Devil Inside" by the Australian band INXS was filmed around the Balboa Fun Zone.
- The 1917 film Cleopatra by J. Gordon Edwards was filmed in Newport Beach.
- The movie All Quiet on the Western Front (1930) was filmed at Fashion Island in Newport Beach before its construction.
- The movie The Boatniks (1970) was filmed in Newport Harbor.
- The Reckless Moment, a 1949 film noir starring James Mason and Joan Bennett, filmed and set in Newport.
- The Breaking Point, a 1950 film noir directed by Michael Curtiz.

== Sister cities ==
Newport Beach has three sister cities, as designated by Sister Cities International:

- Antibes, France
- Ensenada, Mexico
- Okazaki, Japan

== See also ==
- Communities of Newport Beach, California
- List of cities and towns in California
