= Bunnyhenge =

Sculpture in California

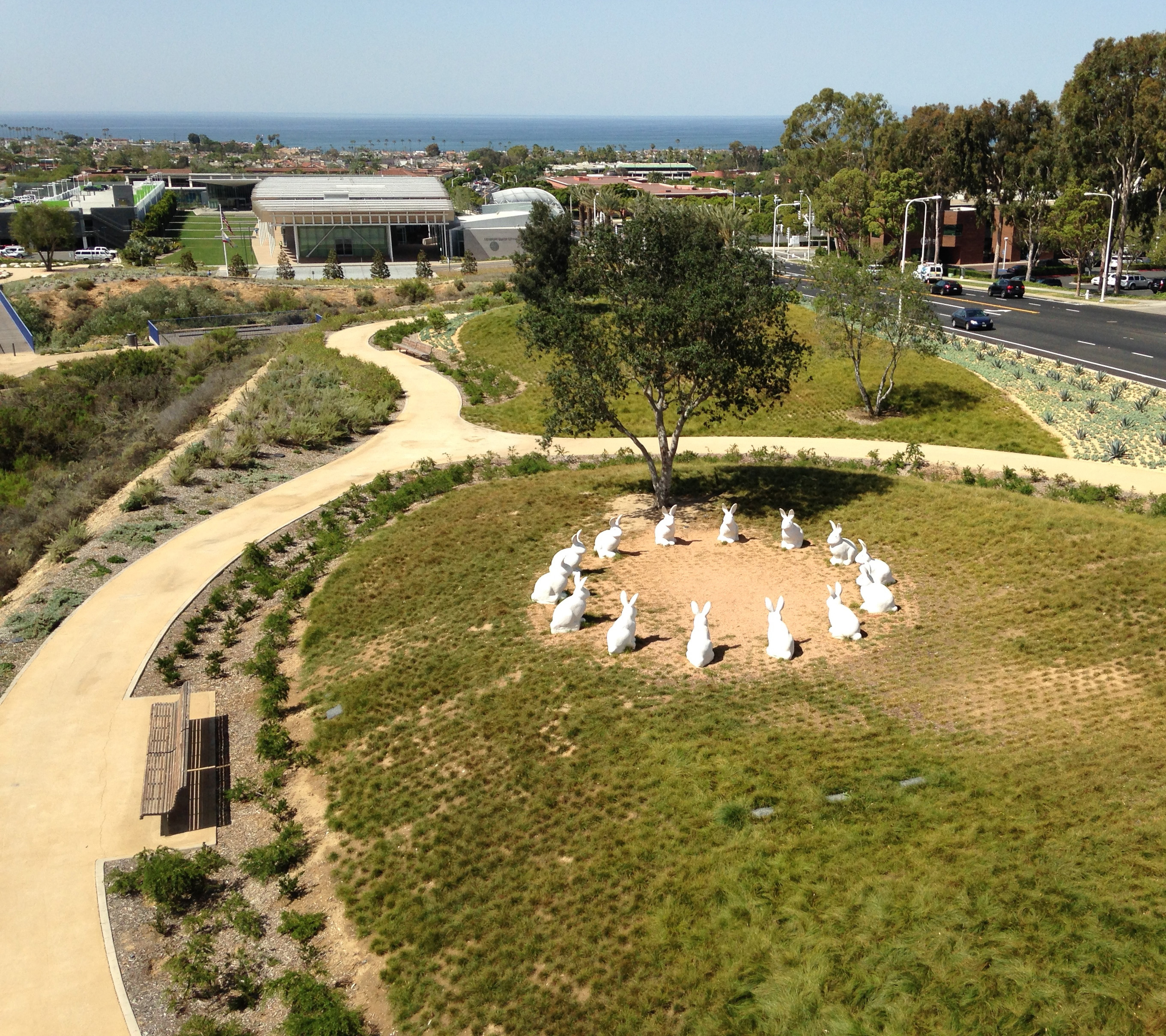
- The sculpture in 2014
- Artist: PWP Landscape Architecture
- Year: 2013
- Medium: Concrete
- Subject: Desert cottontails
- Location: Newport Beach, California; 33.6112°N 117.8711°W
- Owner: City of Newport Beach

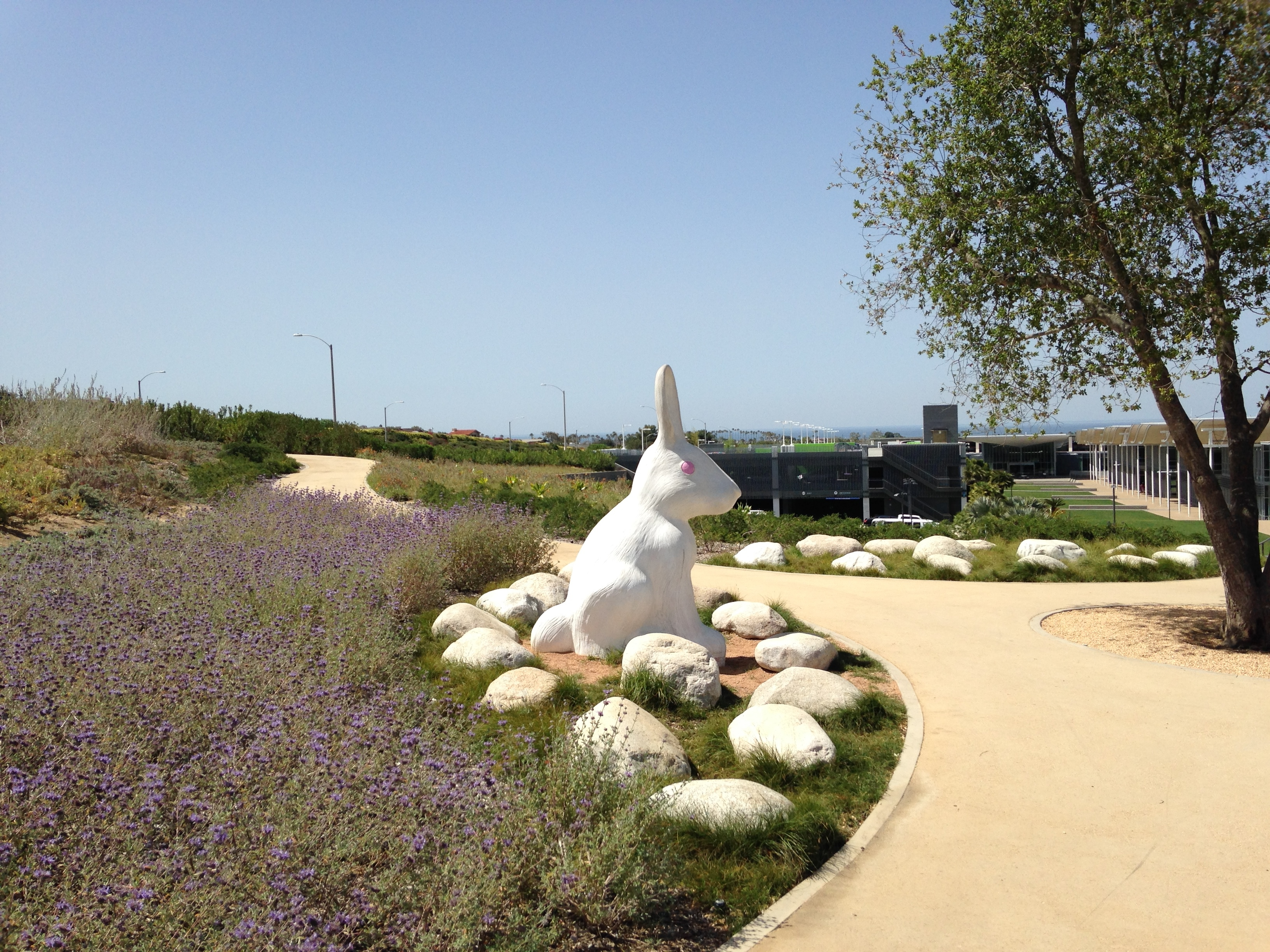
One of the larger rabbits

Bunnyhenge is a public sculpture in Newport Beach, California, United States, depicting fourteen large white rabbits (of the desert cottontail species) sitting on their haunches in a circle. Two larger, 8 ft (2.4 m) rabbits outside the circle are also a part of the sculpture. Made of concrete and placed in the city's civic center, the sculpture garnered controversy when first built due to its improper allocation of city finances, costing $221,000. They were initially made for children to play with.

== History ==
Newport Beach's City Council moved to a more luxurious building in 2013, as it had outgrown its previous headquarters near the harbor. The rabbits were custom-manufactured and were wrapped in their packing material for a few months at their current location before being unveiled. The designer of the sculpture, PWP Landscape Architecture, had thought about using quails, lizards, sea turtles, or willow trees for the centerpiece before, but landed on the desert cottontail in the end.
