= Santa Ana Heights, California =

Coordinates: 33°39′09″N 117°53′41″W

Santa Ana Heights is a community in Orange County, California, United States. The eastern part is located within the city limits of Newport Beach. The community is surrounded by John Wayne Airport and Costa Mesa.

Santa Ana Heights is zoned for more moderate income families, which provides for more modest homes in Newport Beach. It is generally a residential area, with a variety of housing types to suit all families that live in the Santa Ana area. The name is referred to the small foothills that the area is set on.

The unincorporated part of Santa Ana Heights has been a subject of an annexation debate between Costa Mesa and Newport Beach. Orange County found Santa Ana to be the most well equipped city to care for the community, but a vote in 2002 removed this as a possibility. It is included in the city of Costa Mesa's "sphere of influence", which is expected to change to Newport Beach's sphere of influence as the annexation process furthers.

The community is inside area code 949.

Santa Ana Heights was annexed to the city of Newport Beach in two segments. The area east of Irvine Avenue came into the city in January 2002 and the area west of Irvine Avenue came in on January 1, 2008.
