= China House of China Cove =

Coordinates: 33.5962°N 117.8783°W

China Cove Newport Beach California

China House was a distinctive bright pink house with elaborate scrolling and curved Chinese architecture. It was built in 1927 in Newport Beach, California, by a Pasadena resident.

== Background ==
It was demolished in the 1980s. Its location on the rocks at the entrance of Newport Harbor made it a landmark for mariners. China Cove, where the house once stood, was named after the house.
