= Beer can racing =

Type of yacht race

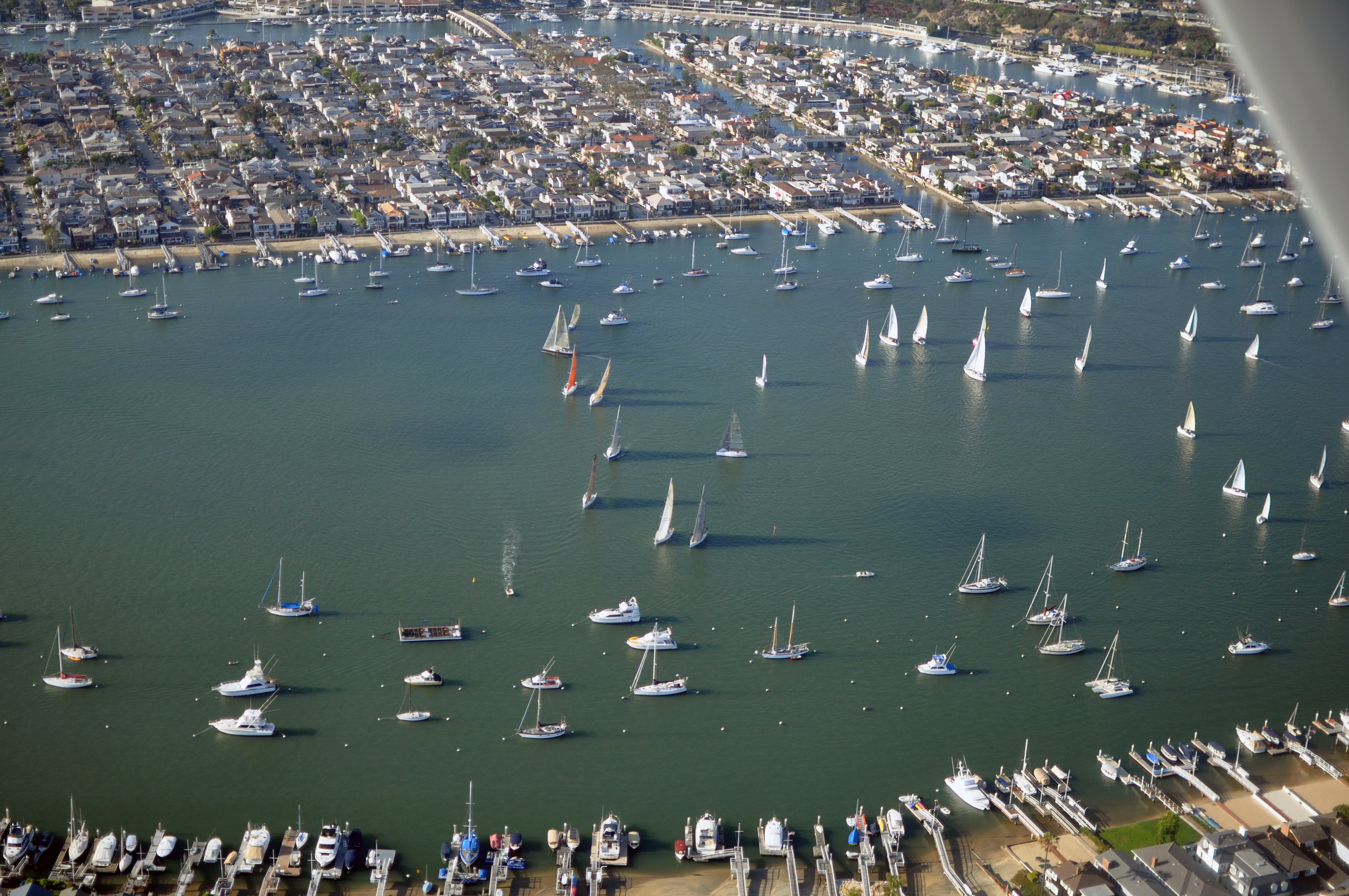
Newport Beach beer can race, 2013

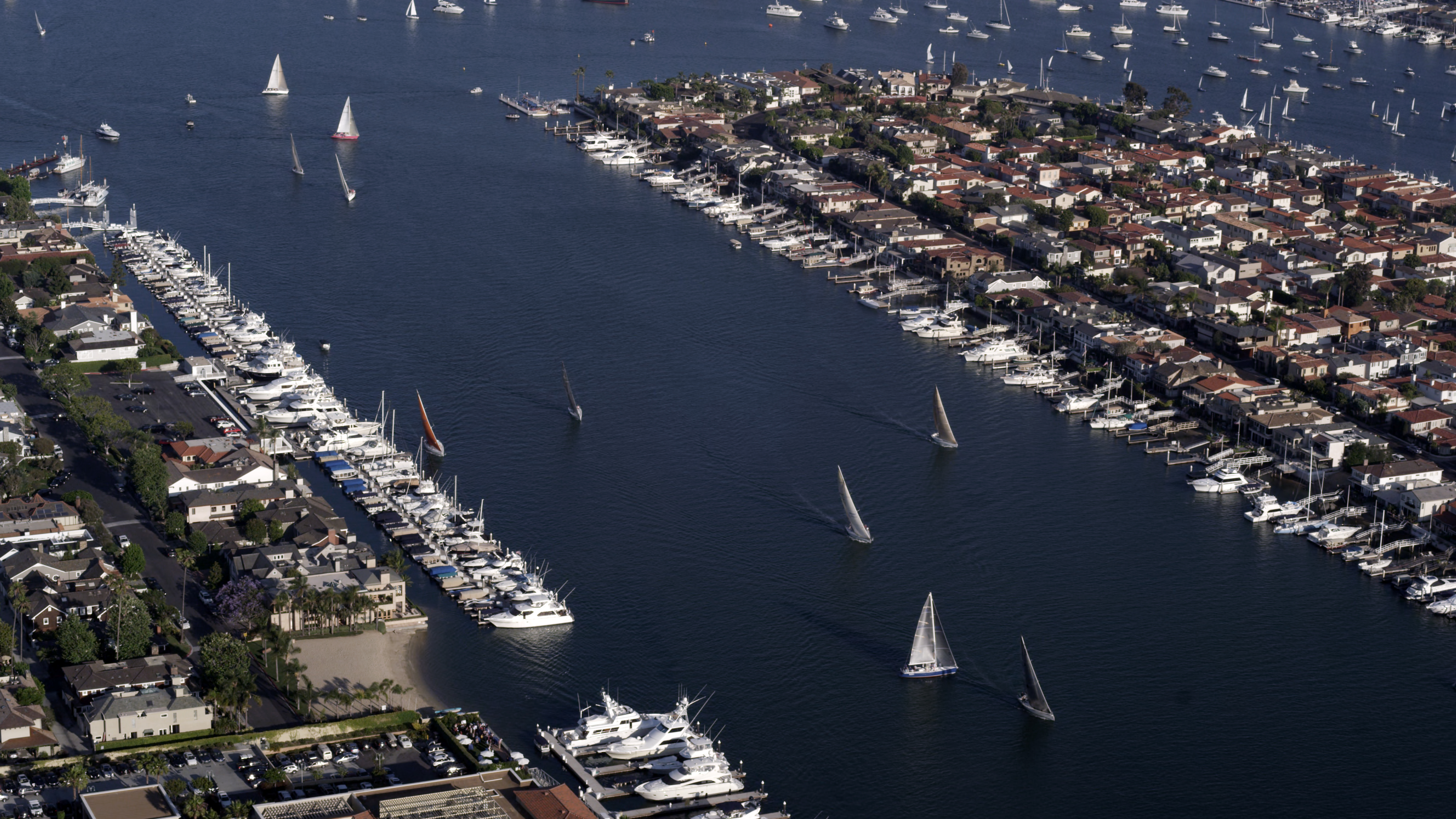
Beer can race at Newport Beach, 2013

Beer can races are casual boat races held in the summer at nautical and yacht clubs.

== Description ==
Beer can races allow people to experience yacht racing in a more relaxed environment than that of a major offshore race. They typically offer races on short courses. Many restrict the use of spinnakers, trapeze harnesses, and the use of twin headsails.

On July 21, 2008, the Los Angeles Times reported that the yachts sailing in the Newport Beach beer can event were being stopped, with citations issued by the Orange County Sheriff to any that were exceeding the 5 mph (4.34 knot) speed limit in the harbor. The issue was later resolved, allowing the boats to maintain speed during the race and while training.

== See also ==
- Darwin Beer Can Regatta
