= Beeks Place =

Location in North Eastern Orange County, California

Beek's Place
- Historic location
- Interactive map of Beek's Place
- Coordinates: 33°49′15″N 117°38′18″W
- Country: United States
- State: California
- County: Orange
- Buildings constructed: 1930s
- Elevation: 2,820 ft (860 m)

Beek's Place is a location in North Eastern Orange County California, elevation 2,820 ft (860 m).

Beek's Place is adjacent to the junction of Black Star Canyon and the Main Divide truck trail. It is approximately 8 miles (13 km) from the Black Star trail head, or about 6 miles (9.7 km) from the Skyline Drive trail head in Corona, California.

== Joe Beek ==
The ruins are what is left of a building belonging to a Mr. Joseph "Joe" Beek, who served as the Newport Harbor Master for a short time. In 1919, he obtained the franchise for the Balboa Island Ferry which remains in the family to this day. He also served as secretary of the California State Senate, until his death in 1968. Joseph Beek secured the rights from Newport Beach to establish the ferry service in 1919 to Balboa Island. He used a small skiff to transport passengers.

== Buildings ==
The main cabin was built during the 1930s, and the smaller one shortly thereafter. They each had one room. The smaller one was built for a caretaker. Although the family only used it on weekends, sometimes a caretaker would live there for up to a few months at a time. The family still goes there frequently and is in the process of reutilizing the property.

All the coniferous trees were planted by the family. A system of cisterns can be seen around the area for water storage which made it possible to grow the trees. One cistern down from the main cabin was used as a swimming pool.

== See also ==
- Joseph Beek
- Santa Ana Mountains

== Sources ==
- "The mystery above Black Star Canyon". Orange County Register. February 2, 2009.
- "'Round, round, round, round, we get around...". Orange County Register. August 21, 2006.
- Joseph Beek listing on FreeBase
