= Balboa Island Ferry =

Ferry service in Newport Beach, California

Coordinates: 33.6042°N 117.8995°W

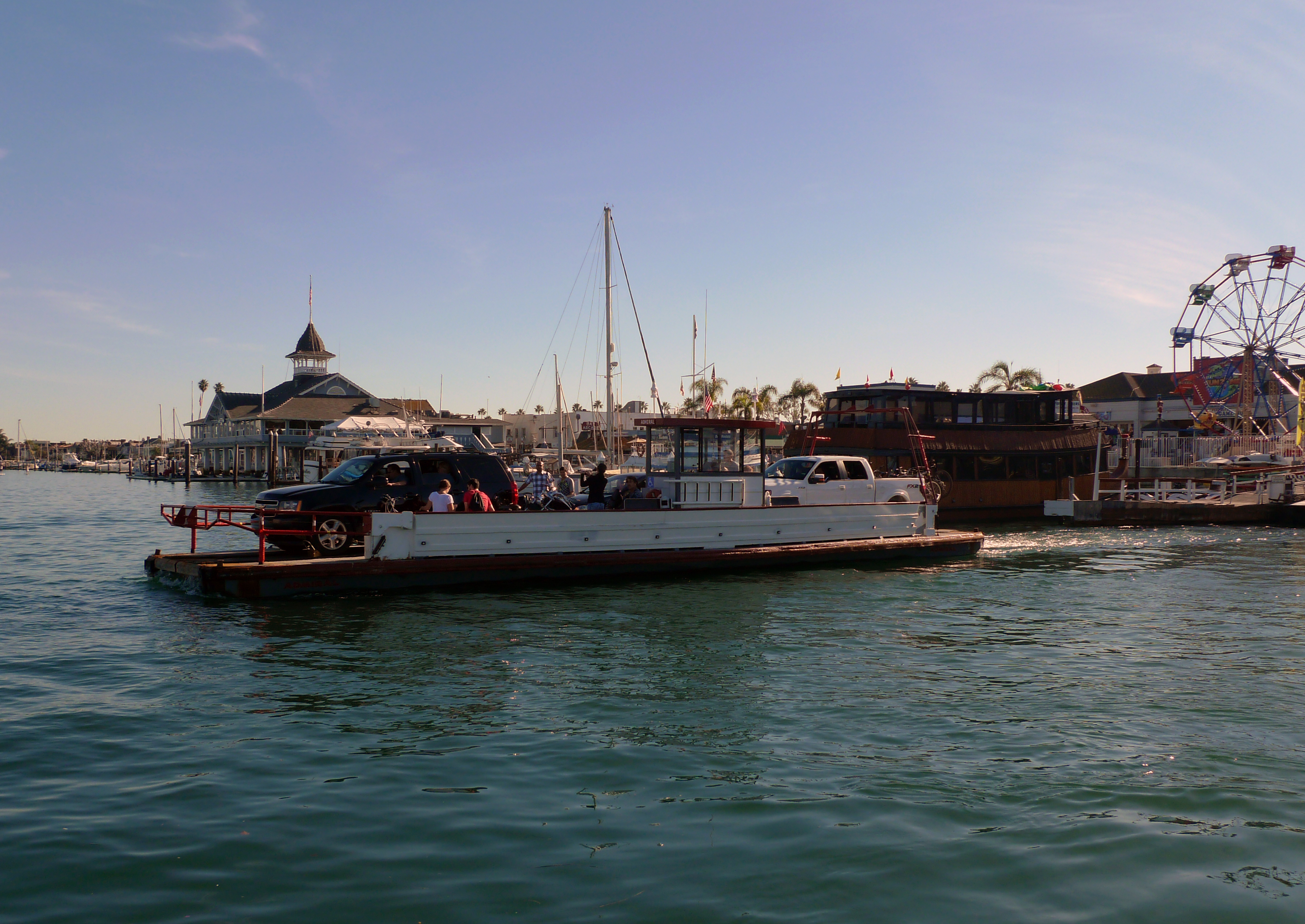
The Balboa Island Car Ferry. In the background at right is the ferry terminal on the Balboa Peninsula.

The Balboa Island Car Ferry is a ferry service in Newport Beach, California.

The ferry boats travel under 1,000 feet from Balboa Island to the Balboa Peninsula (Fun Zone area) and vice versa, reaching a top speed of four miles per hour. The speed limit in the harbor is 5 miles per hour, and the ferry docks about every 5 minutes. A full-time captain will dock the ferry at least 22,500 times every year, traveling at least 3,200 miles every year.

== History ==
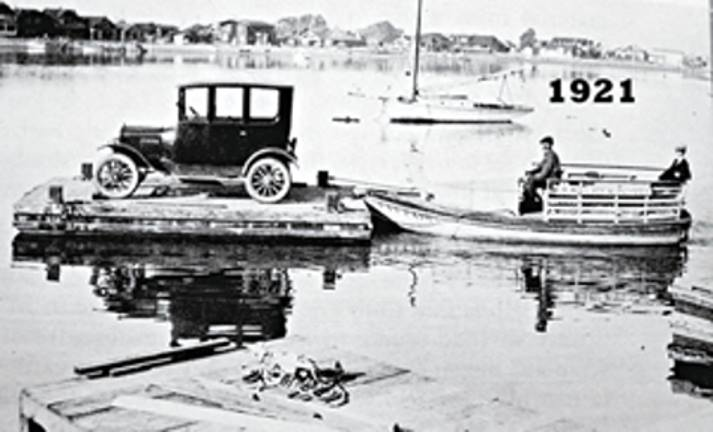
Newport Beach Balboa Island Ferry in 1921

In 1919 Joseph Allan Beek obtained the rights from the city of Newport Beach to provide a ferry service across the Newport Harbor between Balboa Island and the Balboa Peninsula. Before starting the ferry service Beek owned The Ark. The Ark consisted of a giant rowboat with a small engine which Beek used as his first ferry vessel. The Ark carried oars in the event of engine failure. There was no regularly scheduled service and customers telephoned Beek when they needed a ride across the harbor.

In 1919 Beek charged 5 cents per person. Three years after commencing operation, Beek built the Fat Ferry. This vessel held 20 passengers. Beek later built a small one car barge which the Fat Ferry pushed across in front of it.

In the 1950s Beek built three double-ended wooden boats for his ferry service: the Admiral, the Commodore, and the Captain. These three boats remain in service and have transported over two million persons. Each ferry holds three cars and 75 people. As of 2021, the Beek family charges $1.25 per adult, $2.25 per vehicle, $.50 for children ages 5–11, $1.50 for adults on bikes, $.75 for children on bikes, and $1.75 for motorcycles. Children under the age of 5 are free.

The ferry boats need constant maintenance but this does not usually interrupt service. For two weeks in 2008 the ferry service shut down for an extended period, for the first time in 50 years, to rebuild the automobile ramp leading to the boats. In January 2022 another partial outage for construction caused the ferry to accept only foot traffic, but not vehicles.

Beek’s three sons run the business.

== Appearances in popular culture ==
The ferry was featured in the 1949 movie The Reckless Moment starring James Mason and Joan Bennett.

The Commodore ferry appears in the 1999 telefilm The Thirteenth Year.

The ferry was also featured by Huell Howser in California's Gold Episode 10009.

== Gallery ==
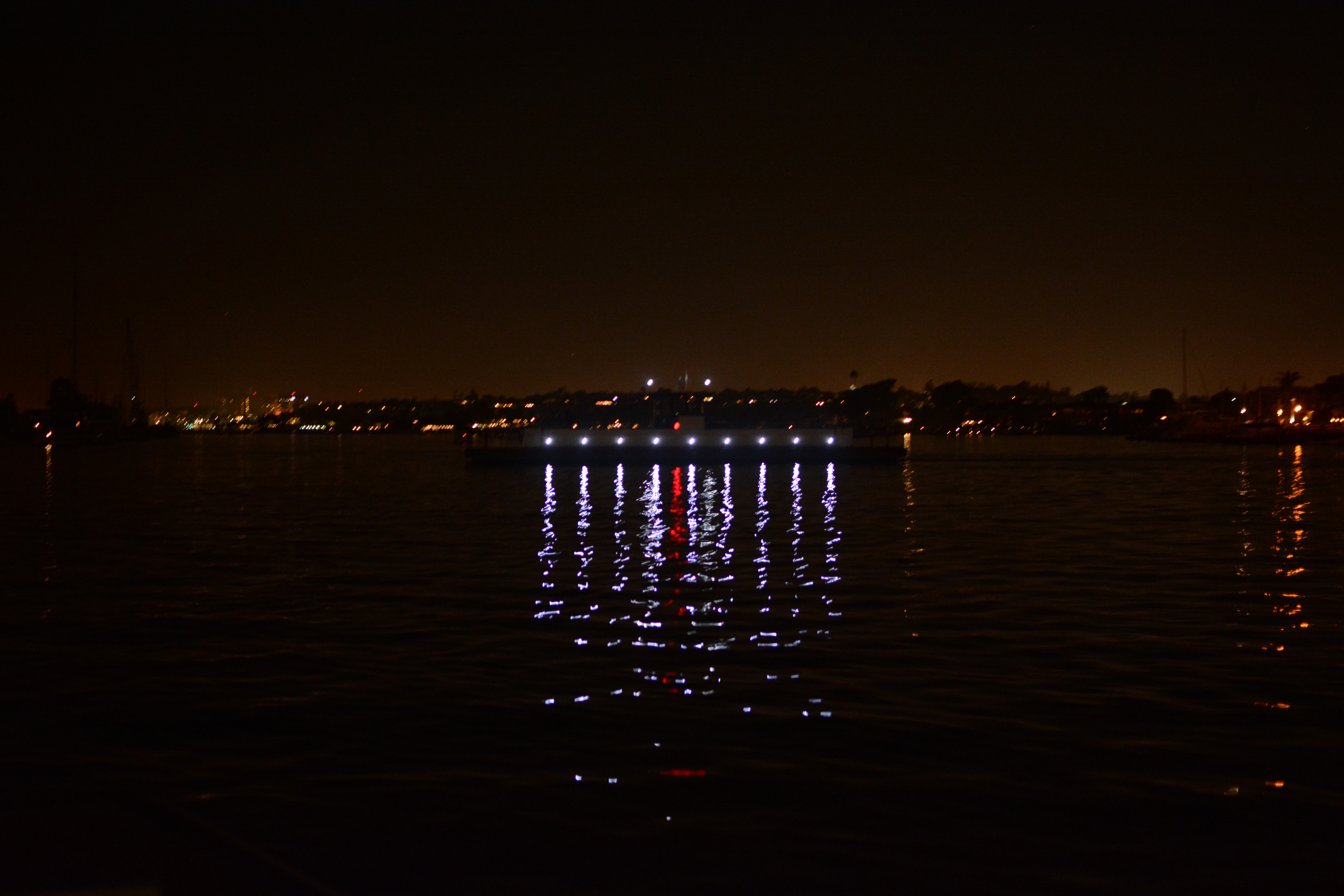
Balboa Island Ferry at night

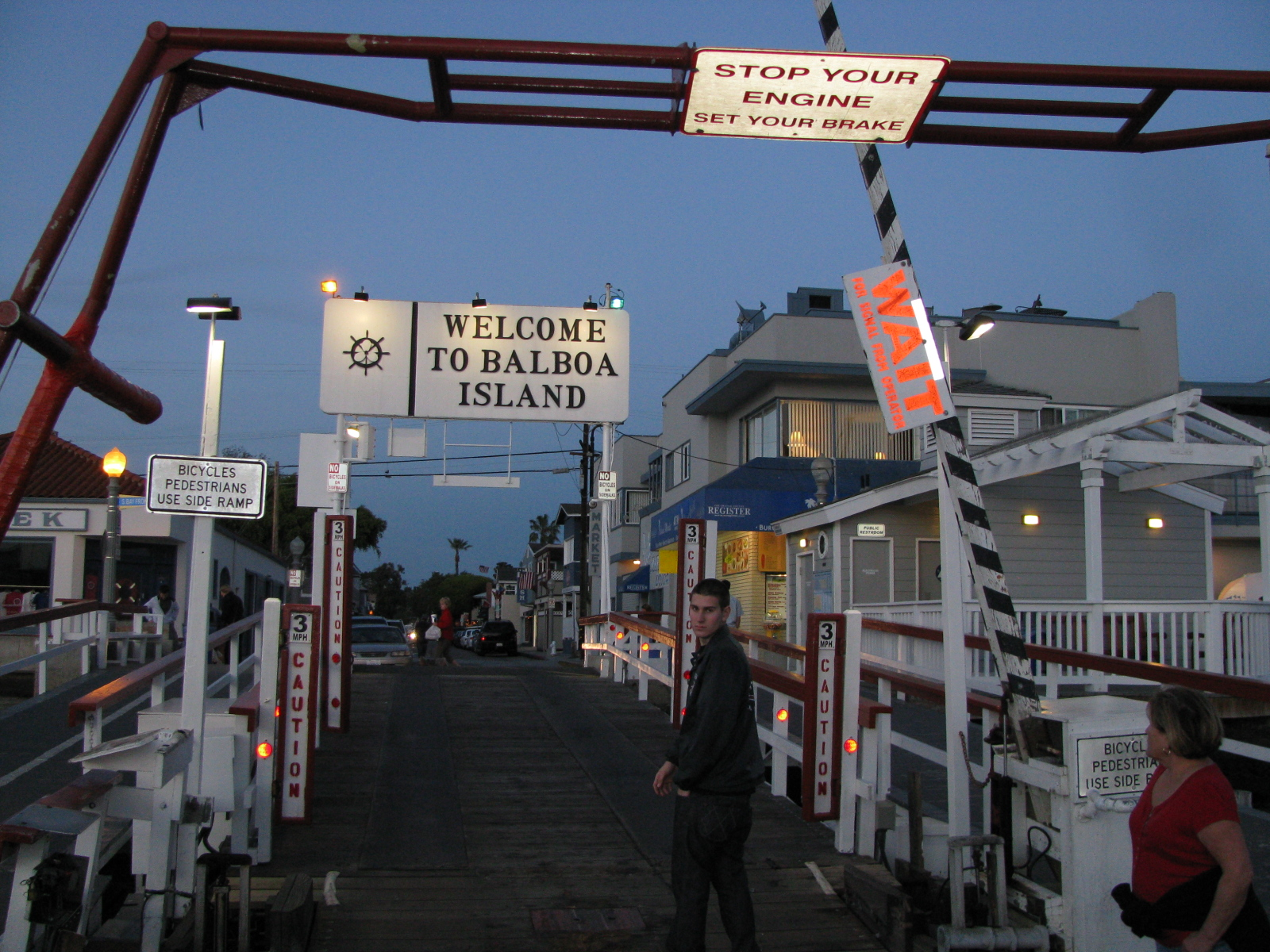
View of the Balboa Island Ferry Terminal on Balboa Island

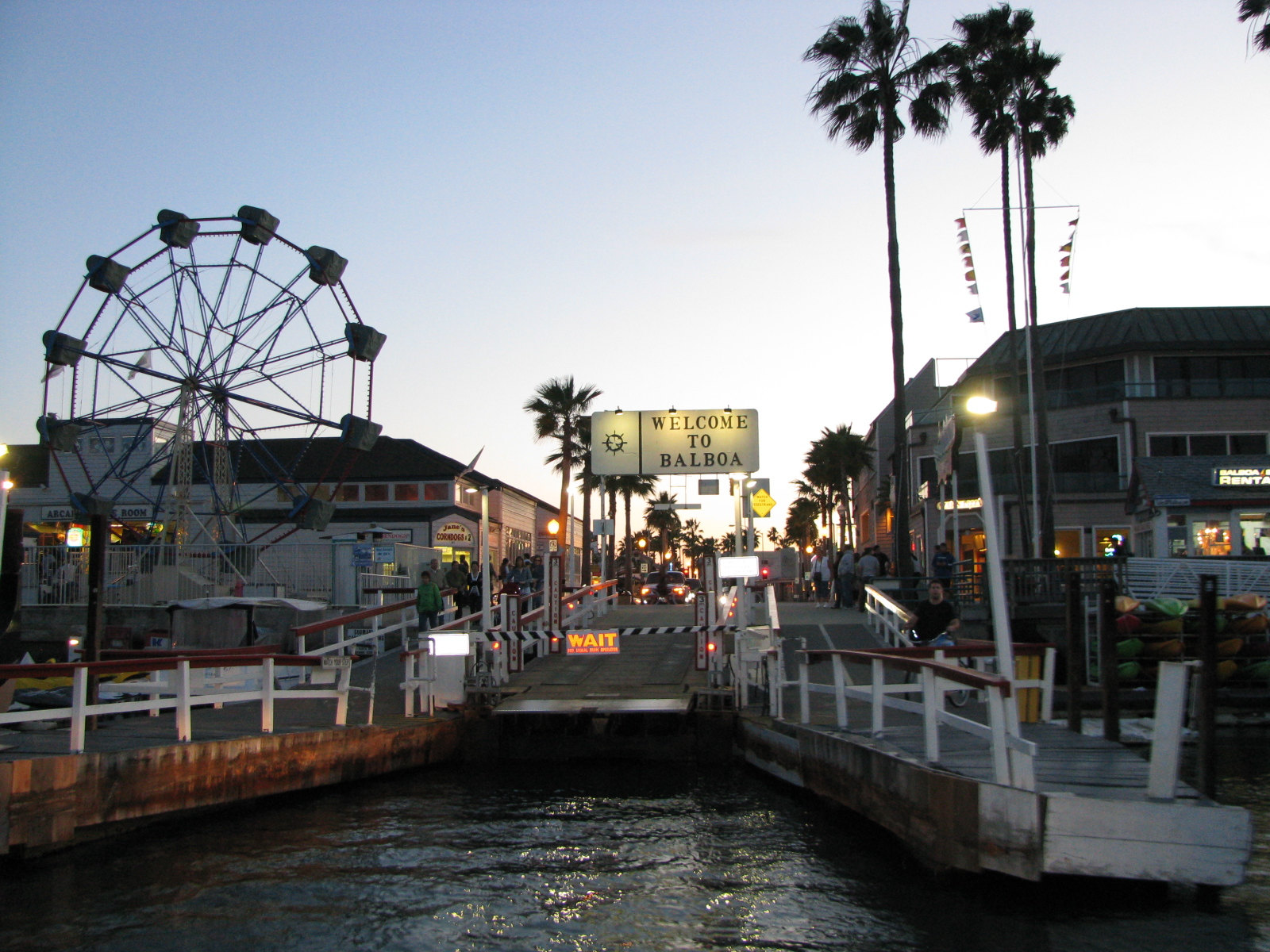
View of the Balboa Island Ferry Terminal on Balboa Peninsula

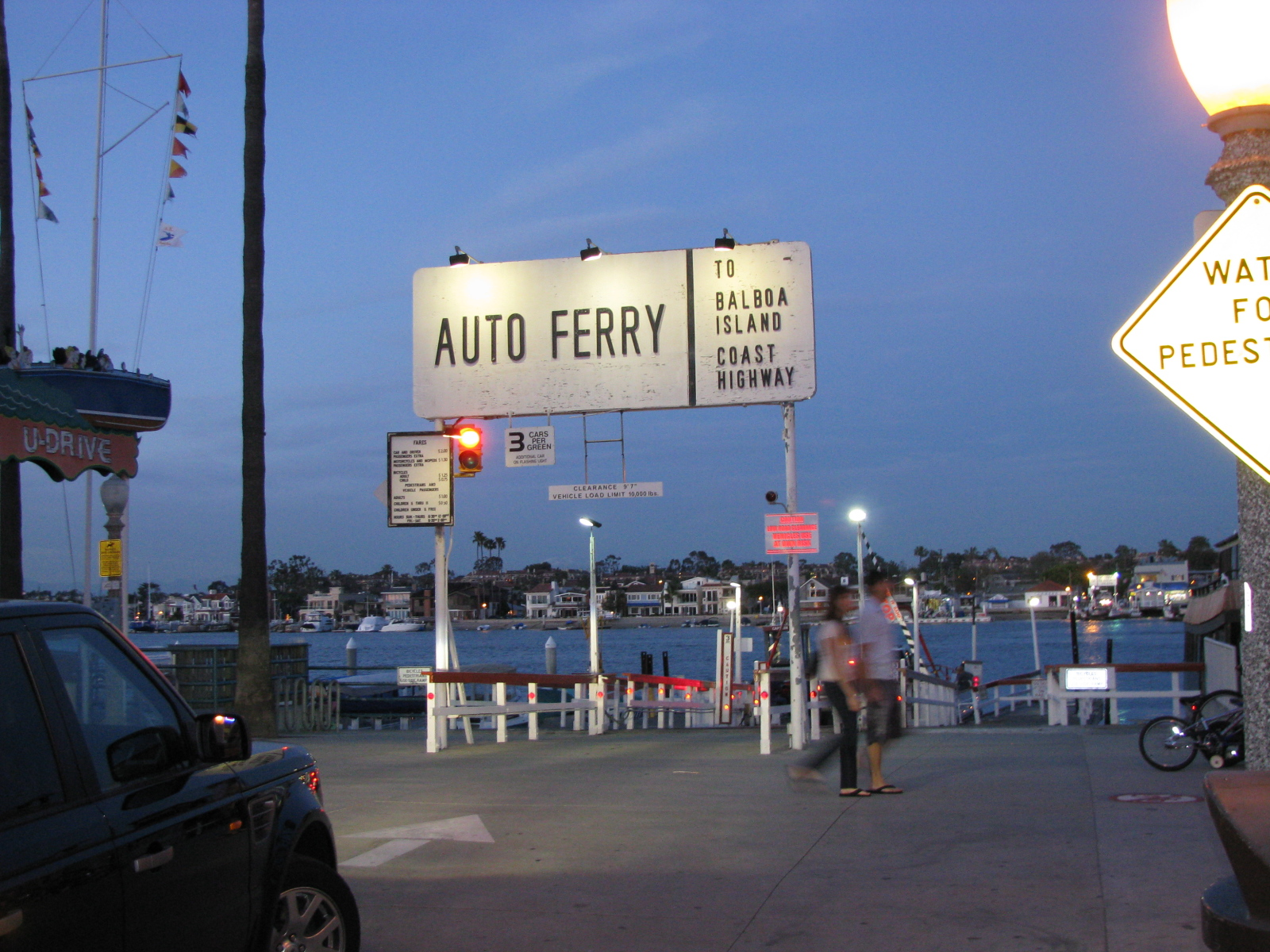
View of the Balboa Island Ferry Terminal on Balboa Peninsula

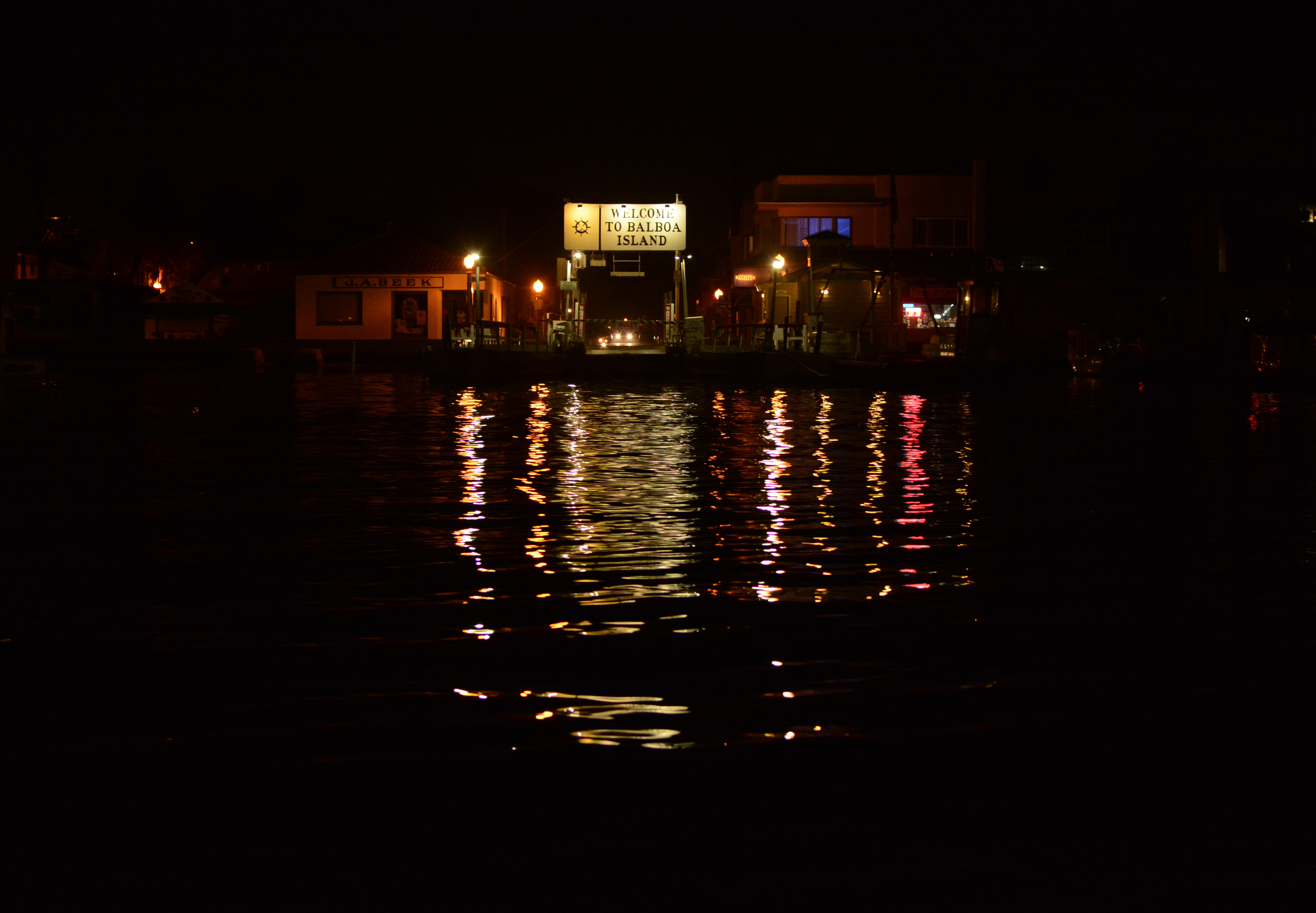

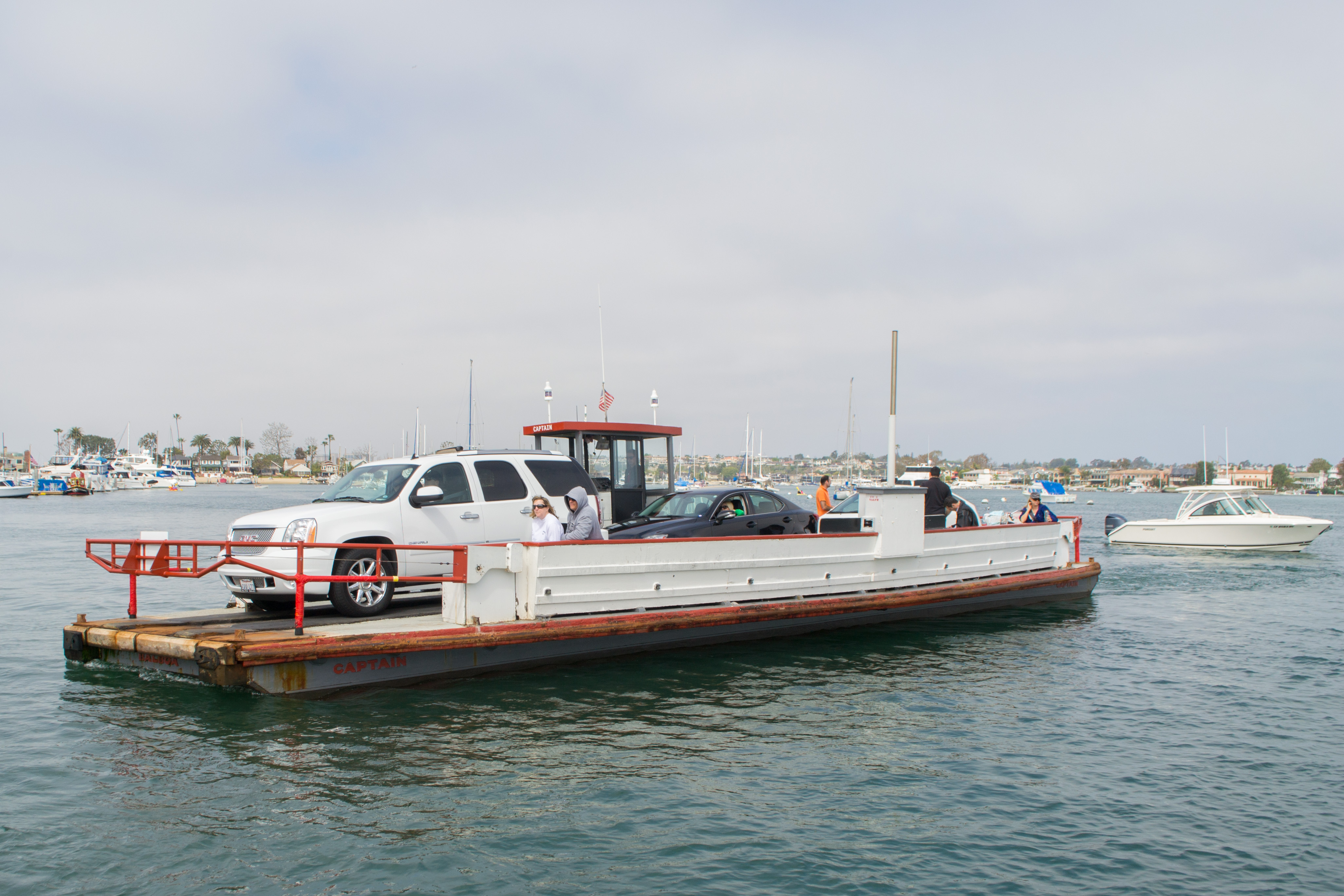

== Other Nearby Historic Sights ==
- Balboa Fun Zone (Est. 1936). Rides, food, shops, merry-go-round, and Ferris wheel.
- Balboa Pavilion (Est. 1906). Newport Beach's most famous landmark.
- Balboa Pier (Est. 1906). Built as a sister project with the Balboa Pavilion to attract landbuyers to the Balboa Peninsula.
- Rendezvous Ballroom (Est. 1928, destroyed by fire 1966). A plaque marks the former site.

== See also ==
- Catalina Flyer, a larger passenger-only ferry service from the Balboa Peninsula to Catalina Island
