= Grace Stoermer =

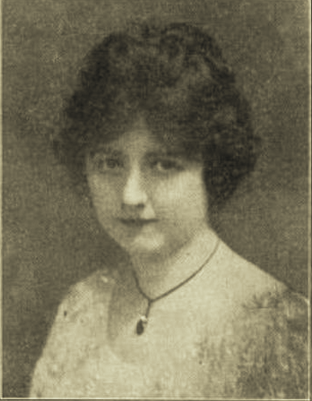
Stoermer in 1918

signature

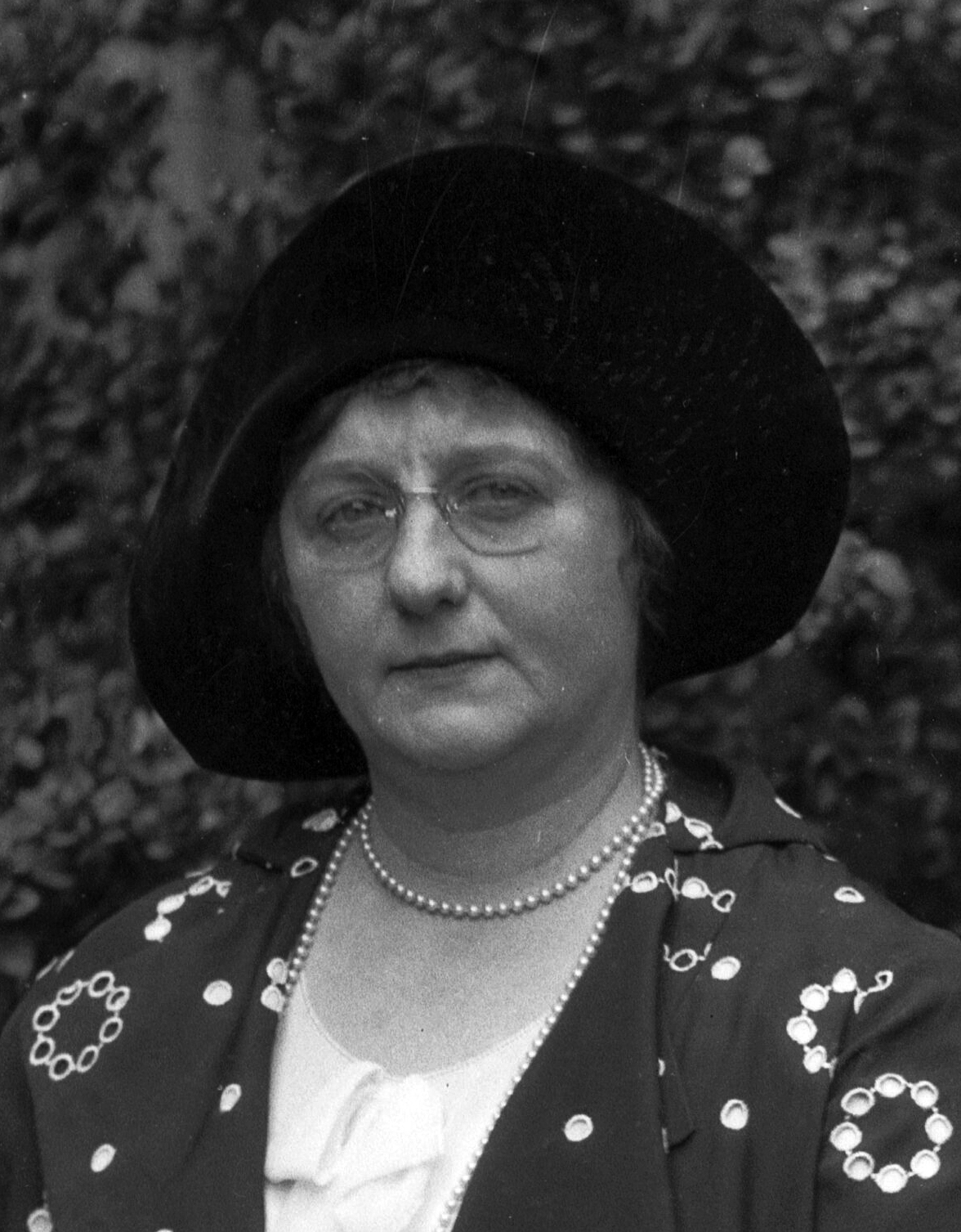
Stoermer in 1930

Grace Stoermer (1887–1961) was a Los Angeles civic leader, banking executive, and the first woman to serve as the Secretary of the California State Senate.

Grace S. Stoermer was born in Los Angeles in 1887. She attended St. Mary's Academy and Los Angeles High School. She was a copyist in the Los Angeles County Recorder's Office for several years, and in 1919 was appointed Assistant Secretary of the California State Senate under Secretary Joseph Beek. At the peak of the women's suffrage movement, she was elected Secretary of the Senate in 1921, becoming the first woman to serve in such a capacity in a state legislature in the United States.

The Secretary of the California State Senate is a nonpartisan officer of the Senate who advises the presiding officer and Senators on parliamentary procedures and is the chief recordkeeper of the Senate. In 1921, the Secretary also called oral roll calls when Senators voted, making Grace Stoermer the first woman to call an oral roll call in the California Legislature. The Secretary is elected by majority vote of the Senators for each two-year session.

Stoemer served one term as Secretary of the Senate before leaving legislative service to become Vice President of the Bank of Italy (later Bank of America) Women's Banking Department. She served as Vice President of this department until 1946, when she became affiliated with the First California Company investment and securities firm.

In addition to her role as a pioneer in women's banking, Stoermer was active in civic affairs. She was the Grand President of the Native Daughters of the Golden West; President of the National Association of Bank Women; President of the Business and Professional Woman's Club of Los Angeles; President of the Soroptimist Club; Chairwoman of LA County Council of Women's Organizations; Chairwoman of the March of Dimes Women's Division; Member of the Teacher's Retirement Board; Executive Director of El Pueblo de Los Angeles (1950s redevelopment plan for the Old Plaza area); and Founder of "Girls Week" in Los Angeles County.

Grace Stoermer never married. She died on October 1, 1961, at the age of 74.
