= Balboa Pavilion =

Coordinates: 33°36′10″N 117°53′56″W

- U.S. National Register of Historic Places
- California Historical Landmark No. 959
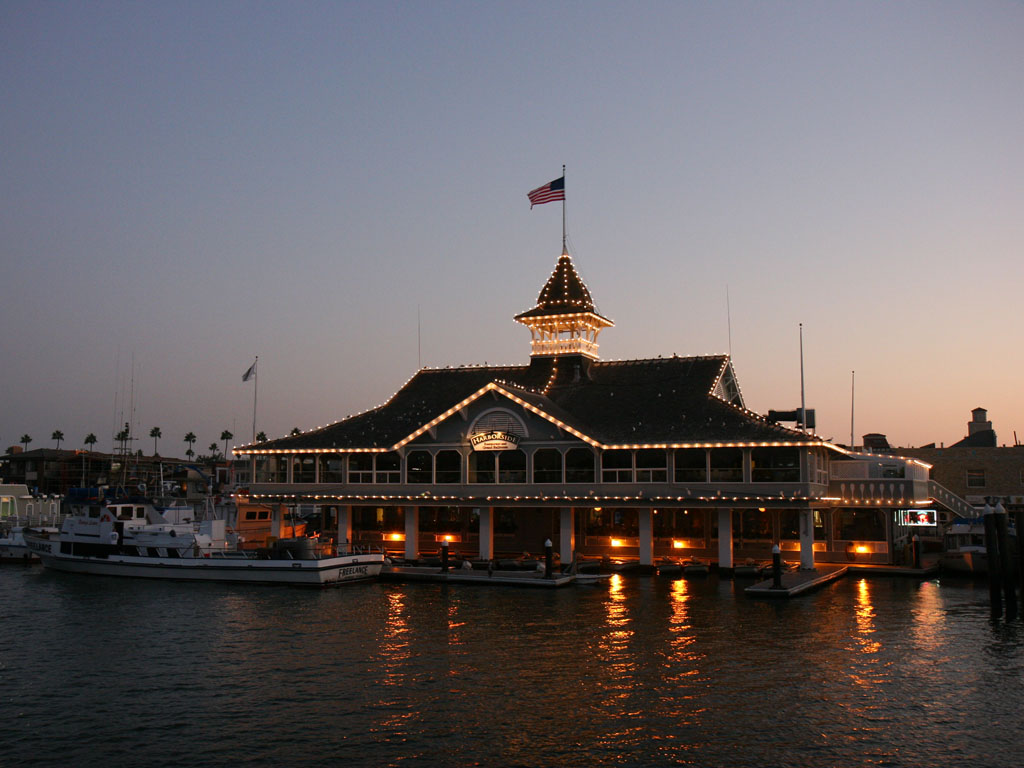
- Location: 400 Main St; Newport Beach, California
- Built: 1906
- Architect: Fred R. Dorn
- Architectural style: Queen Anne Revival
- NRHP reference No.: 84000914
- CHISL No.: 959

Significant dates
- Added to NRHP: May 17, 1984
- Designated CHISL: December 15, 1983

The Balboa Pavilion in Newport Beach, Orange County, California, is a California Historical Landmark and a National Historic Place. Established on July 1, 1906, the Balboa Pavilion played a prominent role in the development of Newport Beach by attracting real estate buyers to an area formerly designated as "swamp and overflow" land.

The Balboa Pavilion is one of California's last surviving waterfront recreational pavilions from the turn of the century. The Pavilion continues to serve the public today as a marine recreational facility and is Newport Beach's most famous landmark, as well as its oldest standing building.

== History ==
=== Origins ===
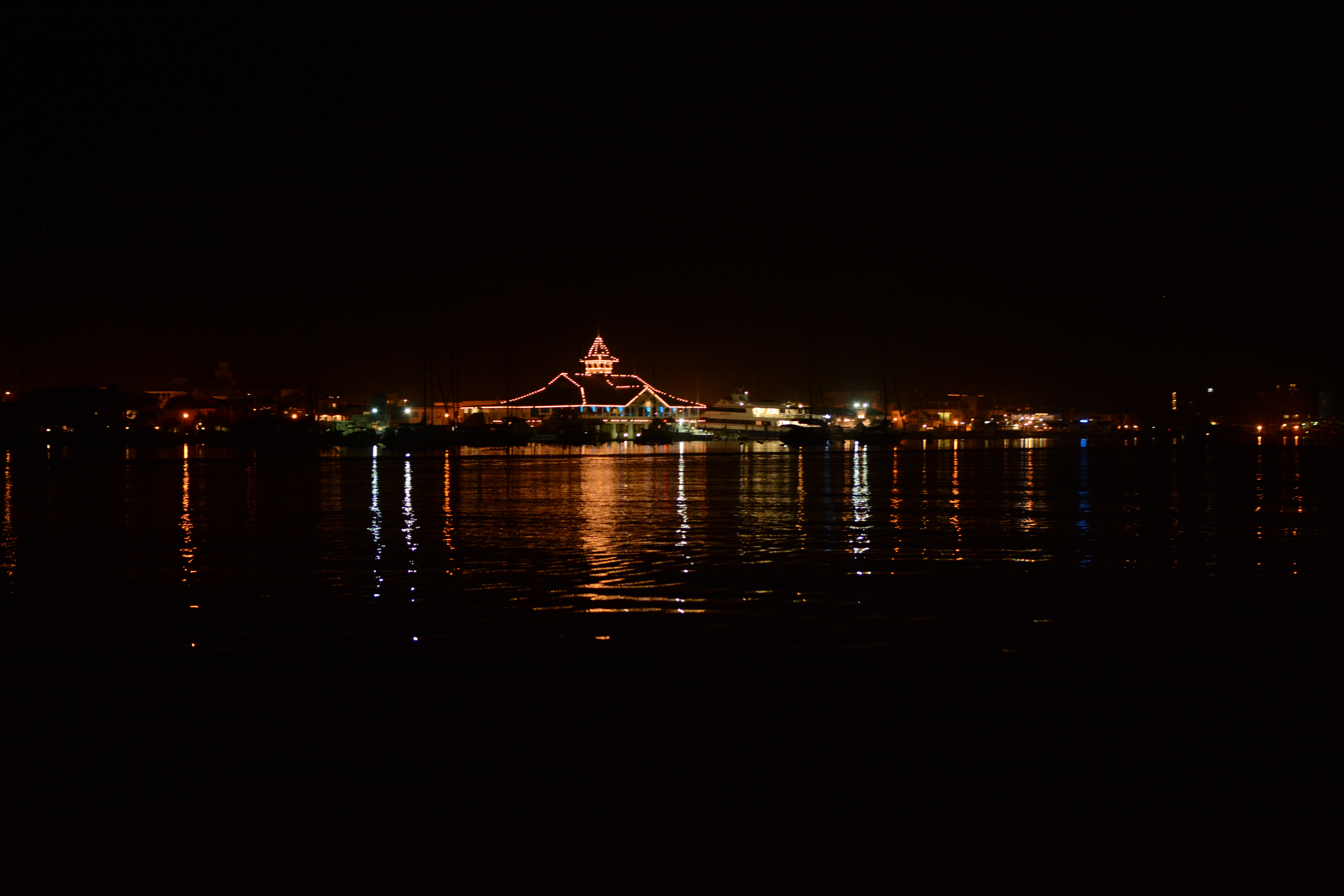
The Balboa Pavilion at night

On September 20, 1905, the War Department in Washington D.C. granted a group of promoters, called the "Newport Bay Investment Company," permission to construct the Pavilion as a "boat-house, bath-house, and pavilion."

The promoters built the pavilion on the Newport Harbor side of the sand spit and its sister project, the Balboa Pier, on the adjacent ocean side of the sand spit, which is today called the Balboa Peninsula. These two structures were built to attract lot purchasers to this area of Newport Beach called Balboa.

=== Design ===
The pavilion was designed by Los Angeles freelance architect Fred R. Dorn, who would later go on to work as an associate of Morgan, Walls & Clements. On July 1, 1906, the 65-foot (20 m)-high Victorian style building was fully completed to coincide with the completion of the Pacific Electric Railway Red Car Line extension to central Balboa near the Balboa Pavilion on July 4, 1906, after only 10 days of construction.

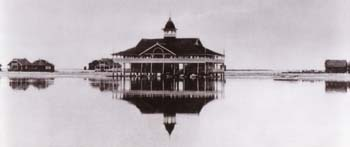
The Balboa Pavilion in 1906

With the extension of the Red Car line, People began to flock to Balboa and some purchased lots, and, thus, the Newport Investment Company's plan worked.

The original building had a second story meeting room and a first story bathhouse. In the bathhouse, people could change from street attire into rented "bathing suits." Soon, yearly Fourth of July bathing beauty parades brought large gatherings of people to Balboa.

=== Big Band era ===
The 1930s ushered in the Big Band era. On weekends the Pavilion featured such prominent bands as Count Basie, Benny Goodman, and the Dorsey Brothers. Phil Harris and his band played regularly on weekdays. The dance style called the "Balboa" originated at the Balboa Pavilion and swept across the United States.

The Pavilion had several upstairs and downstairs card rooms where patrons would gamble.

Until the later 1930s, the Pavilion offered speed boat rides. Two speedy 35-foot (11 m) boats would take off full speed from underneath the Balboa Pavilion with sirens blaring and race out of the bay and into the Pacific Ocean.

=== Post World War II ===
Right after World War II, Newport Harbor was the center of sport fishing activity in southern California with over 100 boats and 9 landings, one of which operated out of the Pavilion. Today, only two sport fishing landings with less than ten boats survive, one of which still operates out of the Balboa Pavilion.

In 1942, the Pavilion's owners leased the upstairs of the building to a gentleman who built and operated a ten-lane bowling alley. Pinsetters hand set the pins.

=== Decay ===
Because the Pavilion is anchored on a narrow strip of sandy waterfront, about 90% of the building was supported on wooden pilings, which extend over the bay. In 1947, the wooden pilings deteriorated, and the building began to collapse into the bay.

In 1947 or 1948, the Gronsky family purchased the deteriorated Balboa Pavilion at a very low price and replaced the deteriorating original wooden pilings with large, concrete pilings. The result was a newly fortified, element-resistant city landmark.

In the later 1940s and early 1950s the Balboa Pavilion housed a "Skil-O-Quiz" bingo parlor which gave prizes rather than cash. But bingo was deemed too wicked, was outlawed, and the sheriff shut the establishment down.

== Museum usage ==
In 1954, Gronsky instituted a shell museum upstairs. The museum displayed over 2.5 million shells. Eventually, the shell fish collection was donated to Bowers Museum in Santa Ana.

=== Restoration ===
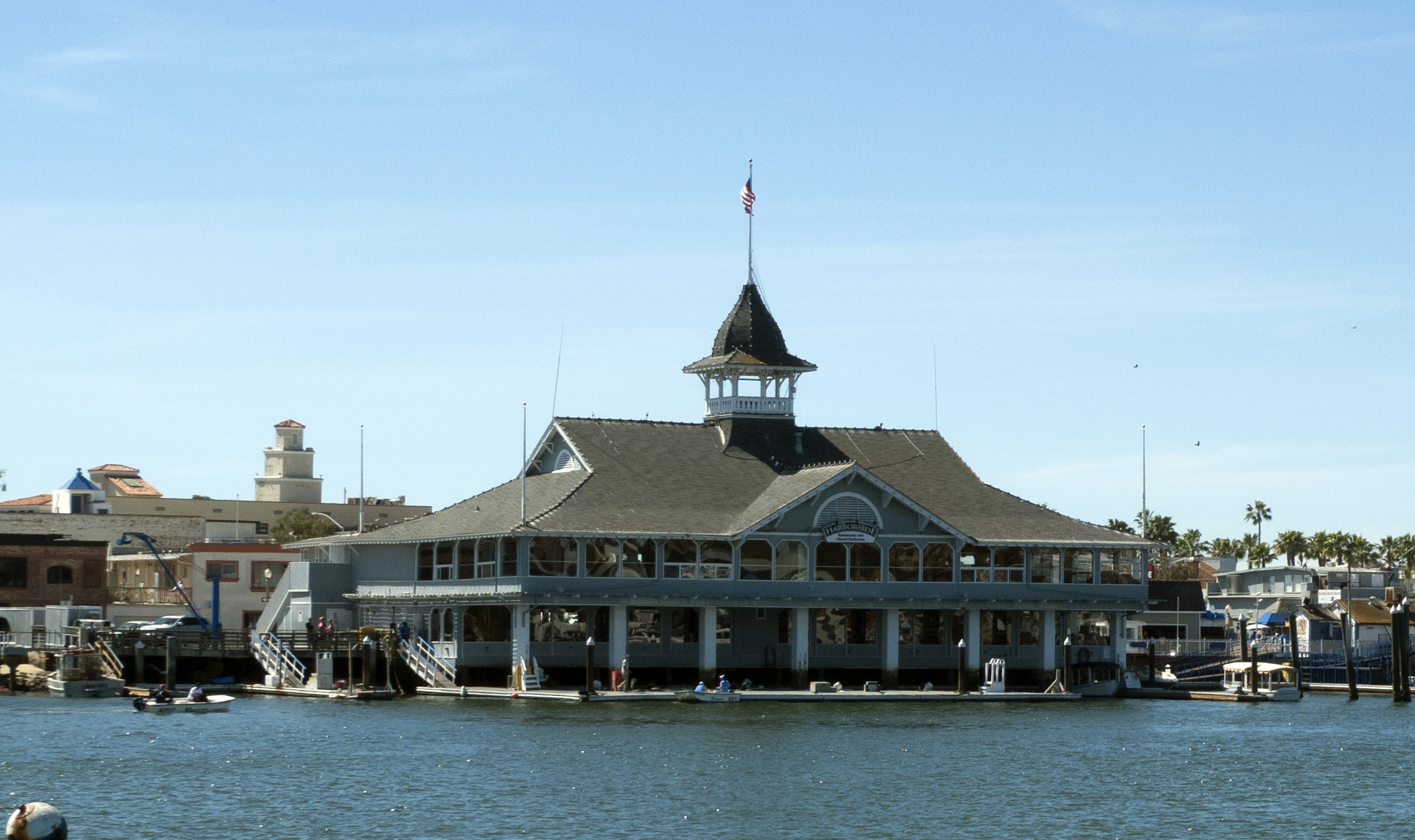
The Pavilion Newport Beach, California

In 1961, the Gronskys sold the Balboa Pavilion to Ducommun Realty Company of Los Angeles. Edmond G. "Alan" Ducommun's "mission" was to restore the building to its original 1906 look, and he generously invested an estimated one million dollars into the property. In 1963, Ducommun added 1500 lights to the buildings exterior which remain on the building today. These lights, along with the Cupula on top of the building, additionally serve as a navigation beacon for night boat travelers.

=== Purchase ===
In 1969, Davey's Locker Inc., a sport fishing operation, purchased the Balboa Pavilion to provide a permanent terminal for the expansion of its Catalina Island passenger service. Its president, Phil Tozer, refurbished the building's interior to reflect the early 1900s architecture.

On May 20, 1980, the Balboa Pavilion Company branched off from Davey's Locker and took over ownership of the Pavilion.

In late November 2005, the Balboa Pavilion Company sold the Balboa Pavilion to the Gugasians.

== Pavilion today ==
Currently, the Balboa Pavilion is used as a marine recreation facility, with sportfishing boats, the transportation terminal for the Catalina Flyer to Catalina Island, small boat (skiff) and (duffy) rentals, whale watching, sunset cruises, a restaurant and upstairs ballroom for banquets, receptions and conferences.

== See also ==
- Balboa Fun Zone (Est. 1936). Rides, food, shops, merry-go-round, and Ferris wheel.
- Balboa Island Ferry (Est. 1919). Transports vehicles and people from Balboa Island to the Balboa Peninsula.
- Balboa Pier (Est. 1906).
- The Wedge (surfing). A fun place to go to watch crazy surfers on rare giant south swell days.
- National Register of Historic Places listings in Orange County, California
