= Balboa Island, Newport Beach =

Neighborhood of Newport Beach, California on an island in Newport Harbor

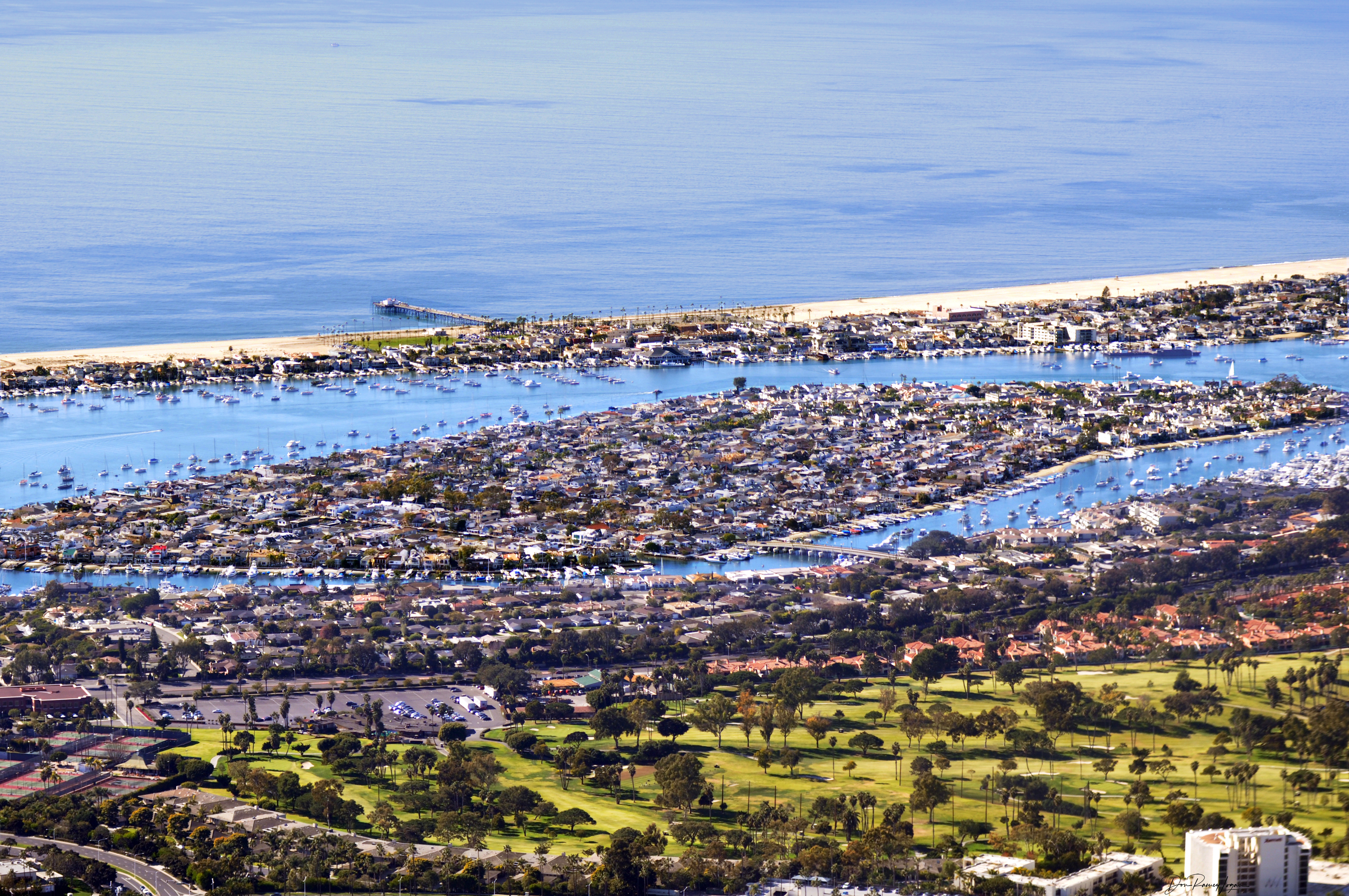
1-08-2013 Balboa Island, Newport Beach California

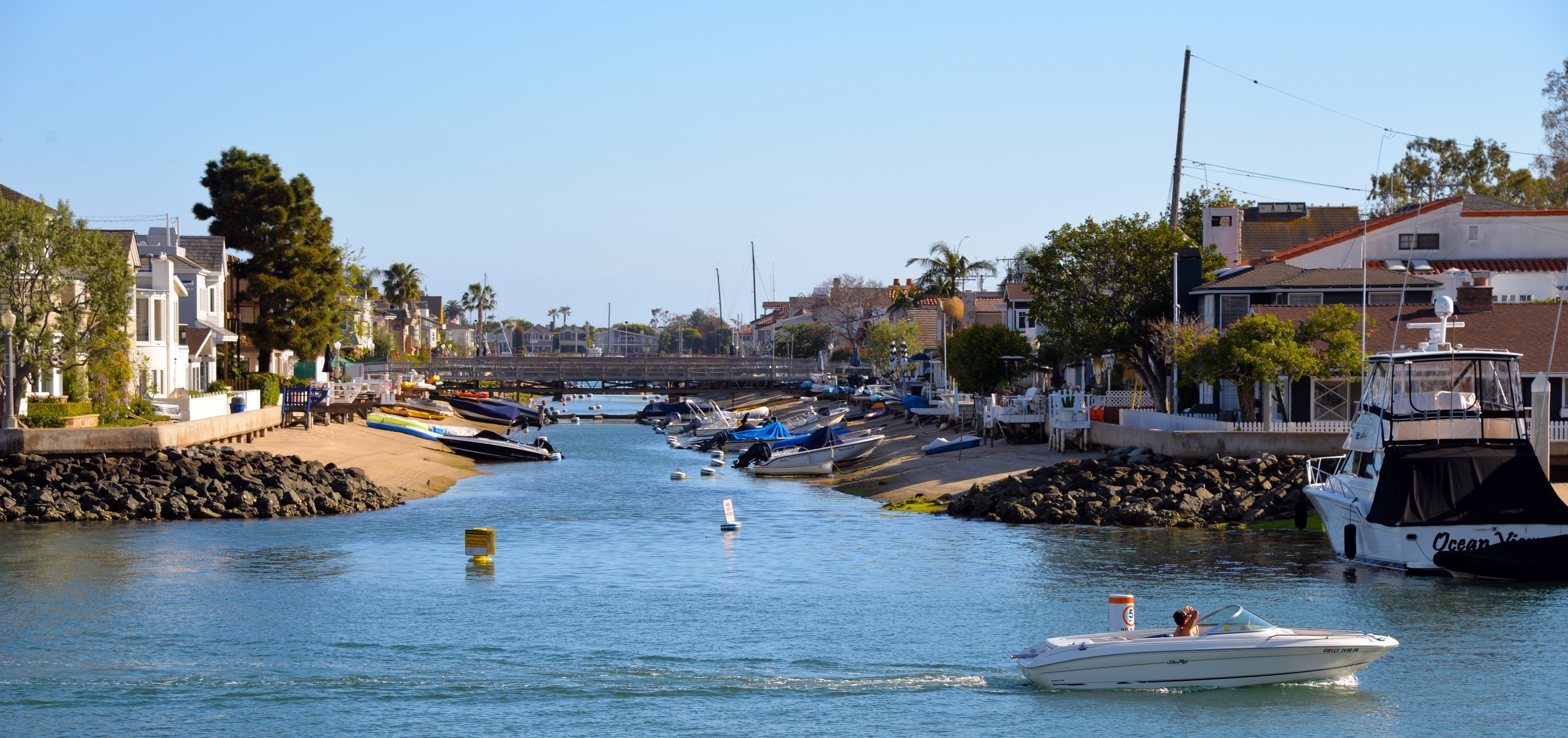
Grand Canal Waterway, Balboa Island, Newport Beach California

Balboa Island is a harborside community in Newport Beach, California, accessible to the public by bridge, ferry and several public docks. The community is surrounded by a paved concrete boardwalk open to pedestrian traffic.

Balboa Island's Marine Avenue is home to local small businesses including restaurants, bakeries, fishing & tackle, and local crafts. The island also has a fire station and a post office.

== Geography ==
The Balboa Island community consists of three modified or artificial islands in Newport Harbor: Balboa Island (33°36′23″N 117°53′40″W), the largest; the smaller Little Balboa Island (33°36′23″N 117°53′16″W) to the east of Balboa Island, joined by a two-lane bridge; and the smallest Collins Isle (33°36′31″N 117°54′1″W) to the northwest of Balboa Island, joined by a one-lane bridge. The Balboa Island community is joined to the mainland by a short two-lane bridge on the northeast of Balboa Island, and a privately operated fleet of three, three-car ferryboats (Balboa Island Ferry) which provide access across the harbor to the Balboa Peninsula which lies to the south.

== History ==
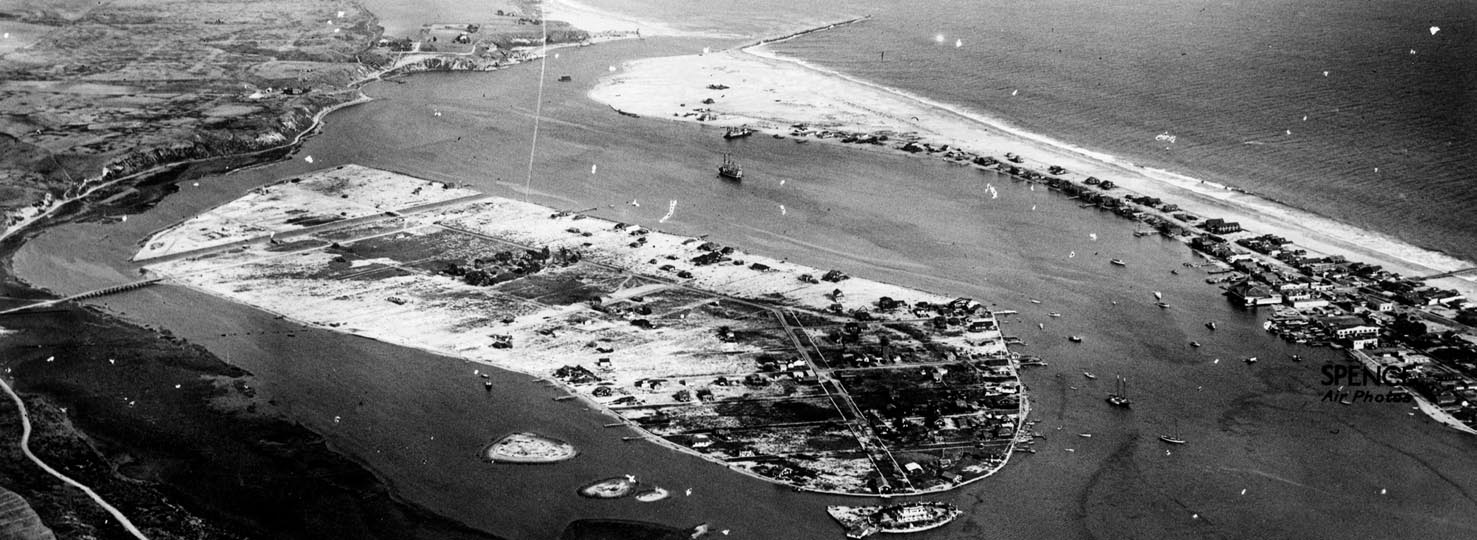
Balboa Island, 1921

=== Mudflat ===
Originally, Balboa Island was little more than a mudflat surrounded by swampland. Today's Newport Harbor emerged only after dredging millions of tons of silt. In the late 1860s, James McFadden and his brother, Robert, purchased a large portion of the future site of Newport, including the oceanfront of Newport Beach, much of Balboa Peninsula, and the sandbars that were to become Balboa Island and Newport Harbor's other islands. They immediately began subdividing and selling their property.

They established a successful fishing wharf on the Balboa Peninsula and the townsite of Newport Beach. In the late 1860s, the bay was used as a landing to load hides, tallow, hay and other goods for export. In September 1870, Captain Samuel S. Dunnells' steamer Vaquero ventured into the bay to offload a cargo of lumber and shingles. Captain Dunnells soon established "Newport Landing" by constructing a small wharf and warehouse near the west end of the present Coast Highway/Newport Bay Bridge.

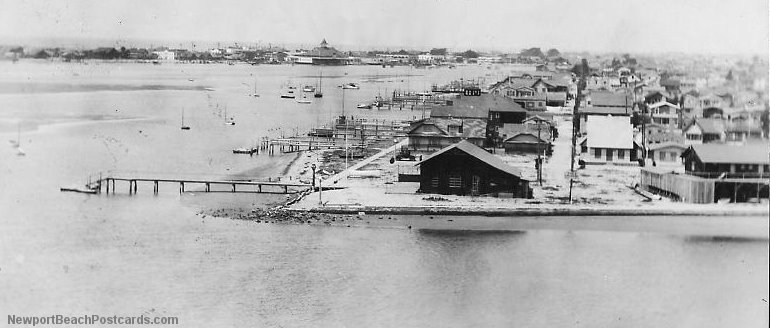
Balboa Island, 1928

The McFadden brothers acquired the landing in 1875 and for the next 19 years operated a thriving commercial trade and shipping business. However, the bay was not yet a true harbor and sand bars and a treacherous bay entrance caused the McFadden brothers to move the shipping business to the oceanfront by constructing a large pier on the sand spit that would become the Balboa Peninsula. The site was ideal because a submarine canyon (Newport Submarine Canyon - a favorite breeding ground for great white sharks), carved along with Newport Bay by the ancient Santa Ana River, provided calm waters close to the shore. McFadden Wharf was completed in 1888 and was connected by rail to Santa Ana in 1891. For the next eight years, the McFadden Wharf area was a booming commercial and shipping center and a company town began to grow. However, in 1899, the Federal Government allocated funds for major improvements to a new harbor at San Pedro, which would become Southern California's major seaport. The McFadden Wharf and railroad was sold to the Southern Pacific Railroad that same year, signaling the end of Newport Bay as a commercial shipping center.

In 1902, James McFadden sold all of his Newport property, including the Newport townsite, about half the Balboa Peninsula, and the swamplands that were to become Harbor, Lido, and Balboa Islands (totaling about 900 acres (360 ha)) to William Stepp "WS" Collins (WS Collins was also president of the Associated Oil Company) and C. A. Hanson for an undisclosed amount, suspected to be $50,000 with $5,000 down.

=== Creation by dredging, 1906-1941 ===
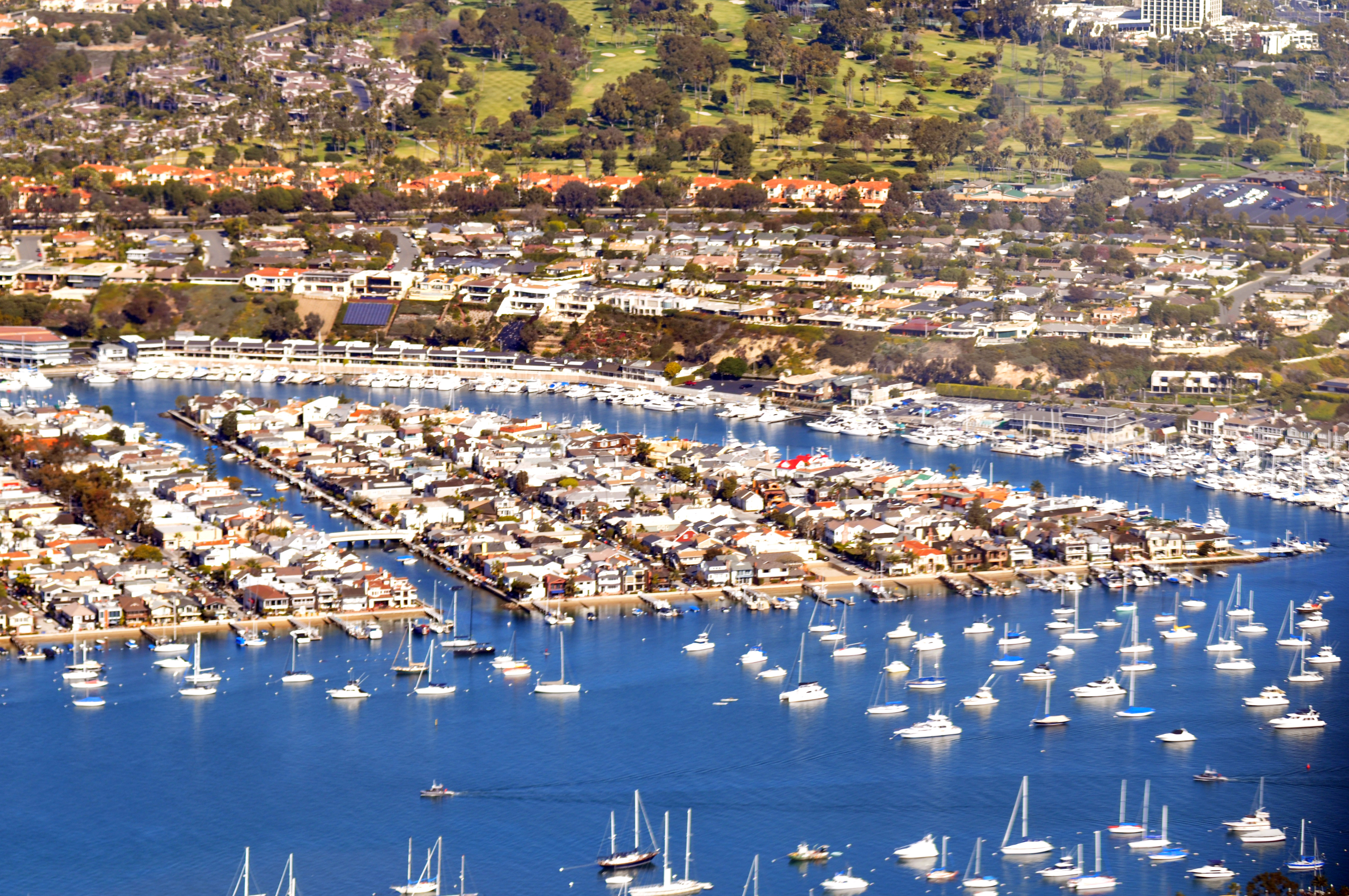
Little Balboa Island

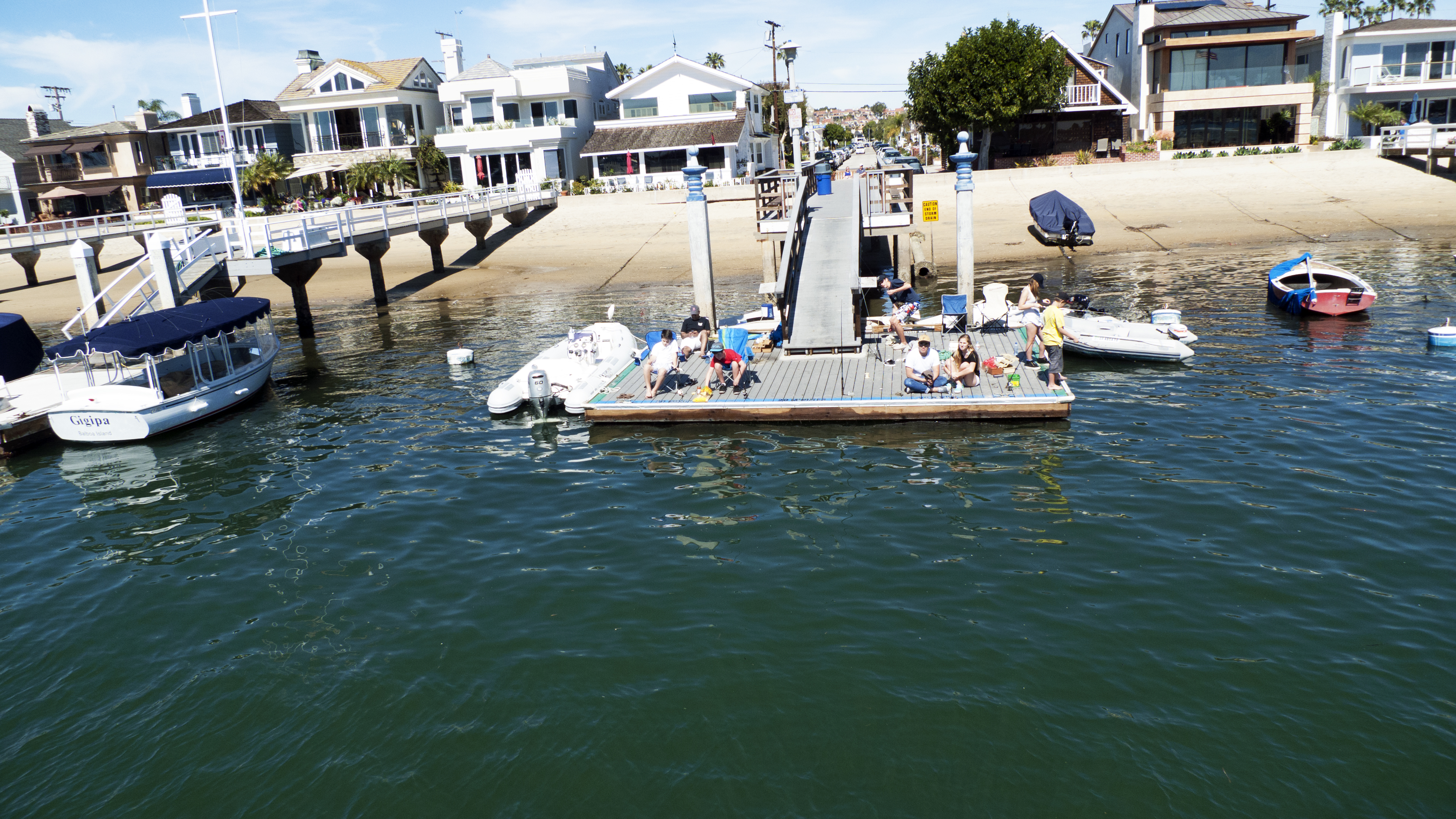
Public Dock on Balboa Island, Newport Beach California

Collins and Hanson saw Newport Bay's resort and recreation potential. They took on Henry E. Huntington as a partner in the Newport Beach Company. Huntington had acquired the Pacific Electric railway system and used it to promote new communities outside of Los Angeles. In 1905, the Pacific Electric "Red Cars" were extended to Newport. By 1906, the Pacific Electric line Red Cars began servicing the Balboa Peninsula and Balboa Pavilion, and soon the Red Cars brought thousands of visitors from Los Angeles.

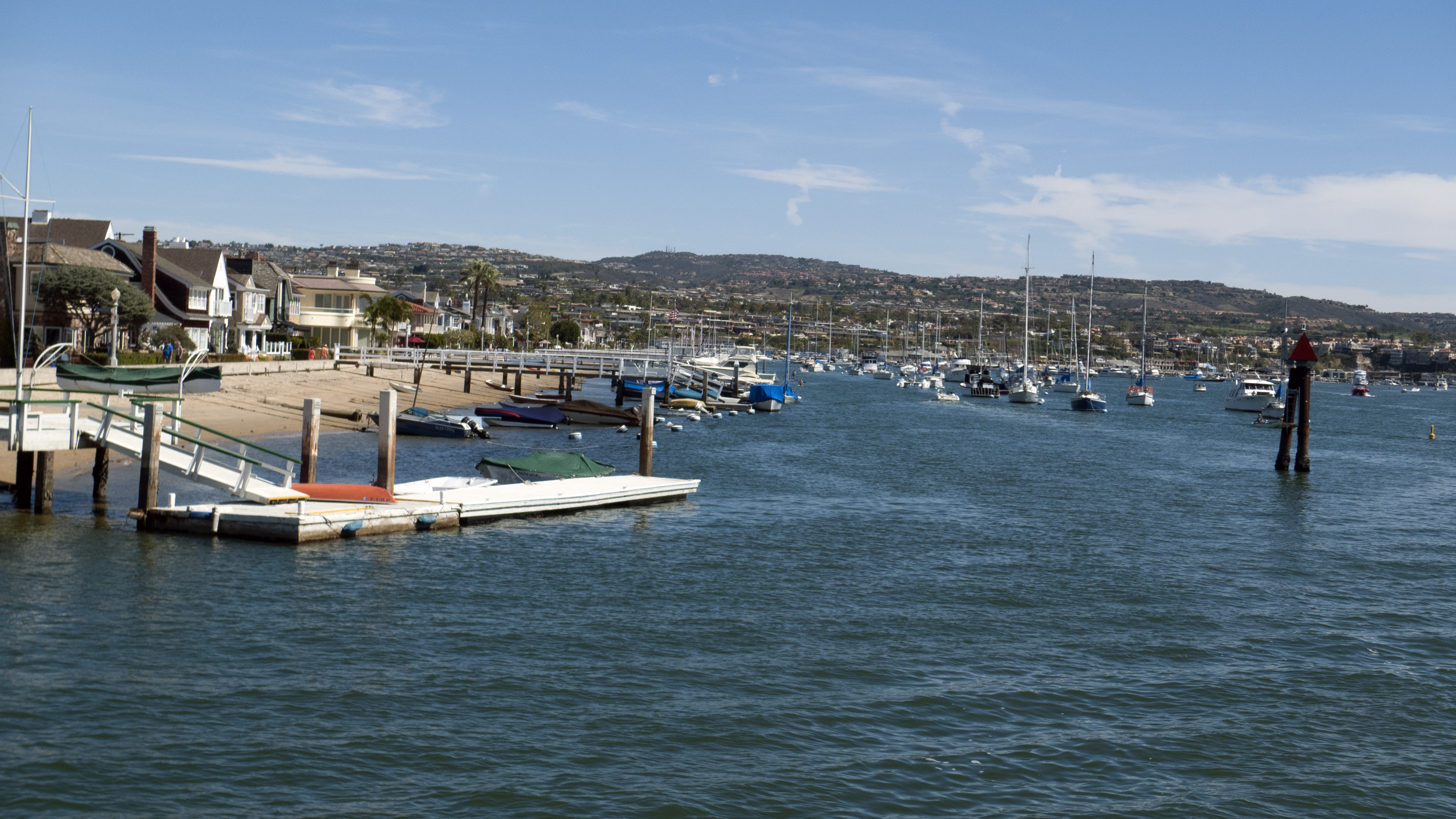
Docks on Balboa Island, Newport Beach California

Collins built a dredge and, by 1906, began dredging a channel on the north side of the bay and depositing the sand and silt on tidelands that would become Balboa Isle. Between 1902 and 1907, many of Newport Beaches' waterfront communities were subdivided, including West Newport, East Newport, Bay Island, Balboa, and Balboa Isle. This established the grid system of small lots and narrow streets and alleys that still exists today.

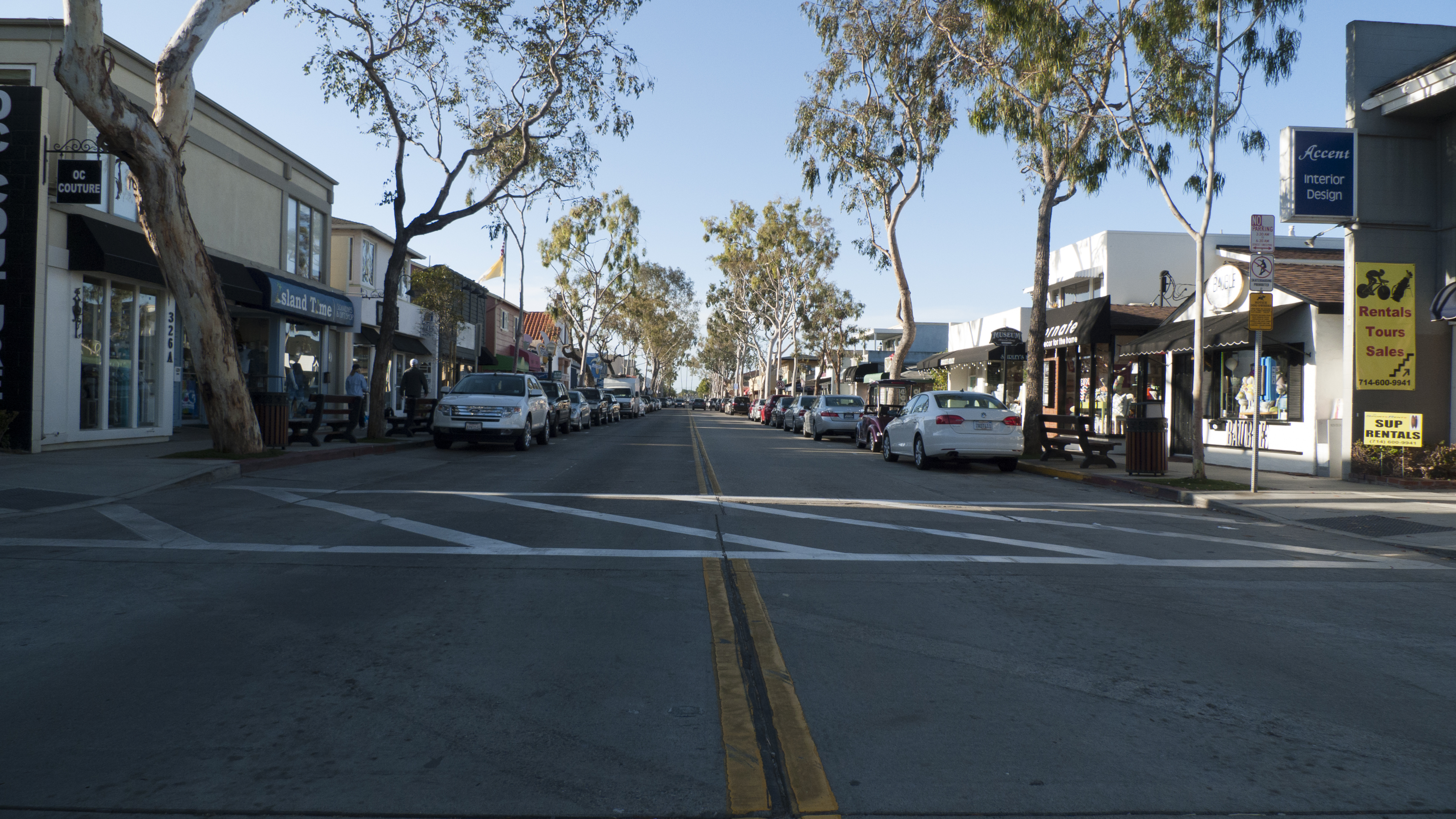
Marine Avenue, main shopping area

Within a few years, real estate promoters began sending salesmen to Pasadena and to Los Angeles (both connected by the Red Cars) to promote property in and around Newport Harbor.

In 1908 and 1909, with permission of the Orange County Board of Supervisors, Collins moved his small dredge to the eastern part of the Newport bay, a mud flat called "Snipe Island," and begin cutting a channel along the north side of the bay across from the Pavilion, piling the sand and silt up on the mud flat and thus Balboa Island was born.

As Balboa Isle began to take shape, Collins launched a national advertising campaign, offering 30 foot by 85 foot inland lots for $600 and waterfront lots for $750. He used a brochure picturing an elegant, but non-existing, hotel on the isle to help sell his lots. He also promised ferry service, electricity, paved streets, sewers, streetlights, and water. Despite the advertisements, Collins originally sold lots on the Island for as little as $25.00, with promises that all streets, sewers and street lights would soon be installed and a bridge and ferry service to follow. Construction was begun for the ferry landing. Streets were staked out and lots were mapped. A few narrow sidewalks were built. A low 14-inch (360 mm) wooden bulkhead was built along the south side of the island and an impromptu sewer system was laid out with pipes draining onto the beaches at their low tide levels to keep the discharge out of sight. He established the Balboa Ferry.

Balboa isle owners struggled for years with poor roads, flimsy sidewalks, sewers that poured directly into the bay, and a wall so inadequate that homes were regularly flooded by high tides. By 1911, discouragement permeated the island, and owners left, tired of inadequate services. Neglected homes dotted the island, and lot prices fell to as little as $325. Collins held an extravagant Fourth of July celebration in 1914. He distributed 8,000 brochures nationwide as well as promoting locally. Thousands came to enjoy races, tours, food, and parades. Lots began selling again. Before long, Collins had sold 700 Balboa Island lots.

The island grew slowly at first, but in 1916, it became part of the City of Newport Beach. In 1918 the Balboa Island Improvement Association was started. The BIIA was a motivating force in working with the City on bulkhead repair, ferry service, a sewer system, water, gas, electricity, paved streets and sidewalks, and street lighting.

In those early days of 1919, water for the Island came from the famous "Wooden Water Tower" built on Agate Street, removed in 1929. In 1920, Park Avenue was the only paved road on the Island. People had outhouses behind their houses as there was no sewer, and some buried their trash in vacant lots. In 1920, a gas utility came to the Island providing heating, cooking, and lights.

Joseph Beek, while still a student at Pasadena City College, was enchanted with the area, and became one of Collins' salesmen. Beek played a crucial role in the development of Balboa Island, and spent a lifetime devoted to it. In 1919, Joe got the first contract for a ferry between the Island and Balboa Peninsula. In 1920, the first car was pushed across the bay (for 10 cents). In 1922, Joe Beek got a 15-year franchise, using the ferry boat "Joker", which could hold two cars. That franchise has continued to this day, with three 64 ft (20 m) boats, named "Admiral," "Captain," and "Commodore," that can each carry three vehicles. Beek later became Secretary of the California State Senate, where he served until his death in 1968.

By 1921, homes were beginning to fill in the Island and Balboa Peninsula. Roads to the Newport Harbor area were still largely undeveloped, and many people still arrived by rail to the peninsula and took the ferry over to the island. Although the first bridge from the mainland to the island's North Bay Front was built in 1912, it was not capable of carrying automobiles until 1929, when it was refurbished.

The seawall was rebuilt in 1922. The Grand Canal wooden bulkhead and walk were rebuilt in concrete in 1929. The present day Bay Front bulkhead, walks and public piers were completed in 1938.

In 1924, the narrow bridge to Balboa Island was replaced with two lanes of wood. That bridge existed until 1928, when it was demolished to make way for a concrete bridge. Some of the wood from the old bridge was used to construct the building next to the "Jolly Roger" Restaurant (now Wilma's Patio) on Marine Avenue. In 1929, a new concrete bridge was built and served for 51 years. The island's population grew from a little over 100 in 1929 to today's 4,500 in winter, and close to 10,000 summer renters. In 1981, the existing concrete bridge was replaced with a new, modern concrete structure with 9' wide walks.

=== Jamboree Road, 1953 ===
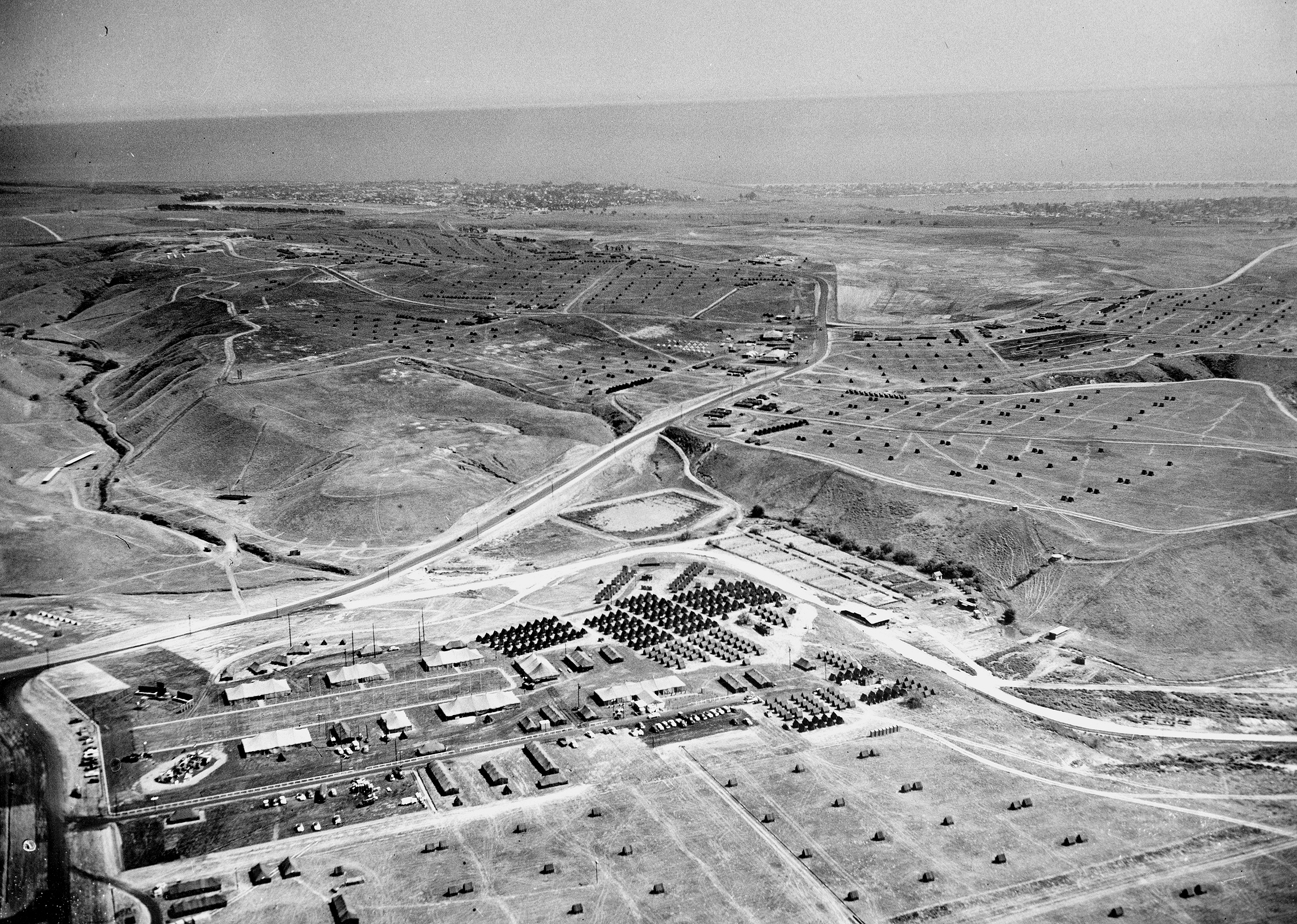
1953 Boy Scout jamboree site

The 1953 National Scout Jamboree of the Boy Scouts of America held its event where Newport Center and Fashion Island are now located. It was the third international jamboree, the first to be held west of the Mississippi River, and had 50,000 scouts from all 50 states and 16 foreign countries. Thousands of tents were pitched in the area accessible only by a muddy two-lane trail called Palisades Road. The road was soon paved, and later the name was changed to Jamboree Road in honor of the event. It remains a major thoroughfare through Newport Beach, ending at Balboa Island.

=== 21st century ===
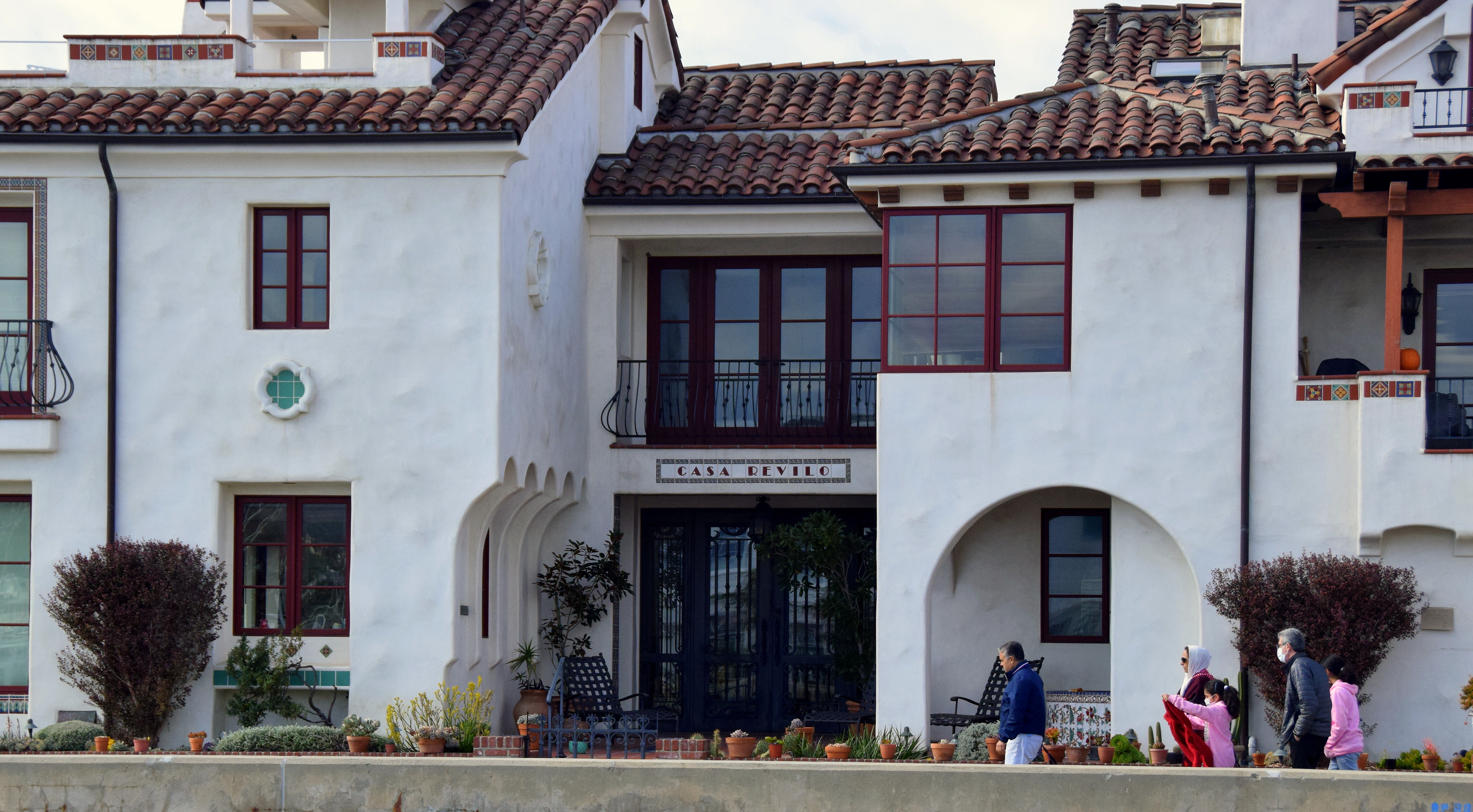
Spanish Colonial Revival architecture in Balboa Island

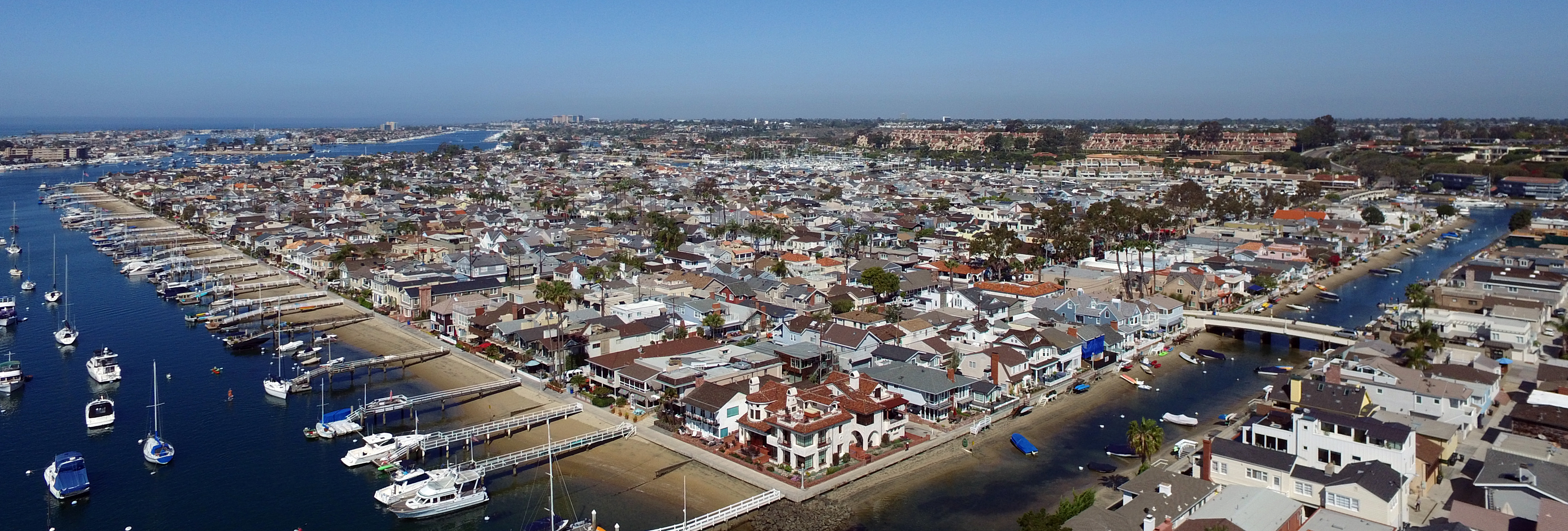
Aerial view of Balboa Island Newport Beach in 2016

Balboa Island celebrated its centennial in 2016 with a parade.

According to the 2000 US Census, Balboa Island was one of the densest communities in Orange County. Approximately 3,000 residents live on just 0.2 square miles (0.52 km^{2}) giving it a population density of 17,621 person per square mile—higher than that of San Francisco. Despite having some of the country's most expensive homes, most of the dwellings are on small lots. A lot size on Balboa Island is 30 feet (9.1 m) x 85 feet (26 m). In 2008 teardowns on interior lots of that size were going for $2,000,000. As times change some of the lots are being cobbled together into 1.5 or 2.0 sized lots for larger homes.

The perimeter of the island along the Bayfront is dotted with piers for the homeowners' boats. Marine Avenue and Agate Avenue form the commercial spine of the island.

Balboa Island has several associations. The Balboa Island Improvement Association, a voluntary group of people who live or work on Balboa Island; the Business Improvement District, a merchant-sponsored group on Marine Avenue; and the Little Balboa Island Association, a group of home owners only on Little Balboa Island. There is plenty of opportunity for community involvement on Balboa Island.

Balboa Island is one of the most expensive real estate markets in North America outside of Lower Manhattan. A two-bedroom house with a water view from the living room can cost about $3 million. Lot value is $2 million. Interior new construction sells for $4 million. Bayfronts range from $3.5 million to $9 million.

Balboa Island's only bar, the Village Inn (or VI, as locals like to call it), has sat near the end of Marine Ave for more than 80 years.

== In popular culture ==
The 1949 film noir The Reckless Moment, directed by Max Ophüls, is primarily set on Balboa Island, a change from the Elizabeth Sanxay Holding novel that the film was based on.

In The Girl Most Likely, a 1958 RKO musical, the main character Dodie, played by Jane Powell, lives on Balboa Island and travels by ferry to her job on the mainland.

The sitcom Arrested Development is partially set on Balboa Island, where the family-owned frozen banana stand is located.

The 2000 film Time Share is set on Balboa Island.

In the Netflix series Dirty John the two main characters lease a waterfront property together on Balboa Island after dating for only five weeks.

In the indie game Raft, the player travels to Balboa Island to gather materials and weapons.

The track "I Wish I Looked a Little Better" from the album In Outer Space by the band Sparks mentions Balboa Island.

== Notable residents ==
- Buddy Ebsen — actor and dancer
- J. Warren Kerrigan — early silent era movie star
- John Vallely — retired basketball player

== See also ==
- List of islands of California
