= Balboa Fun Zone =

Family destination in California

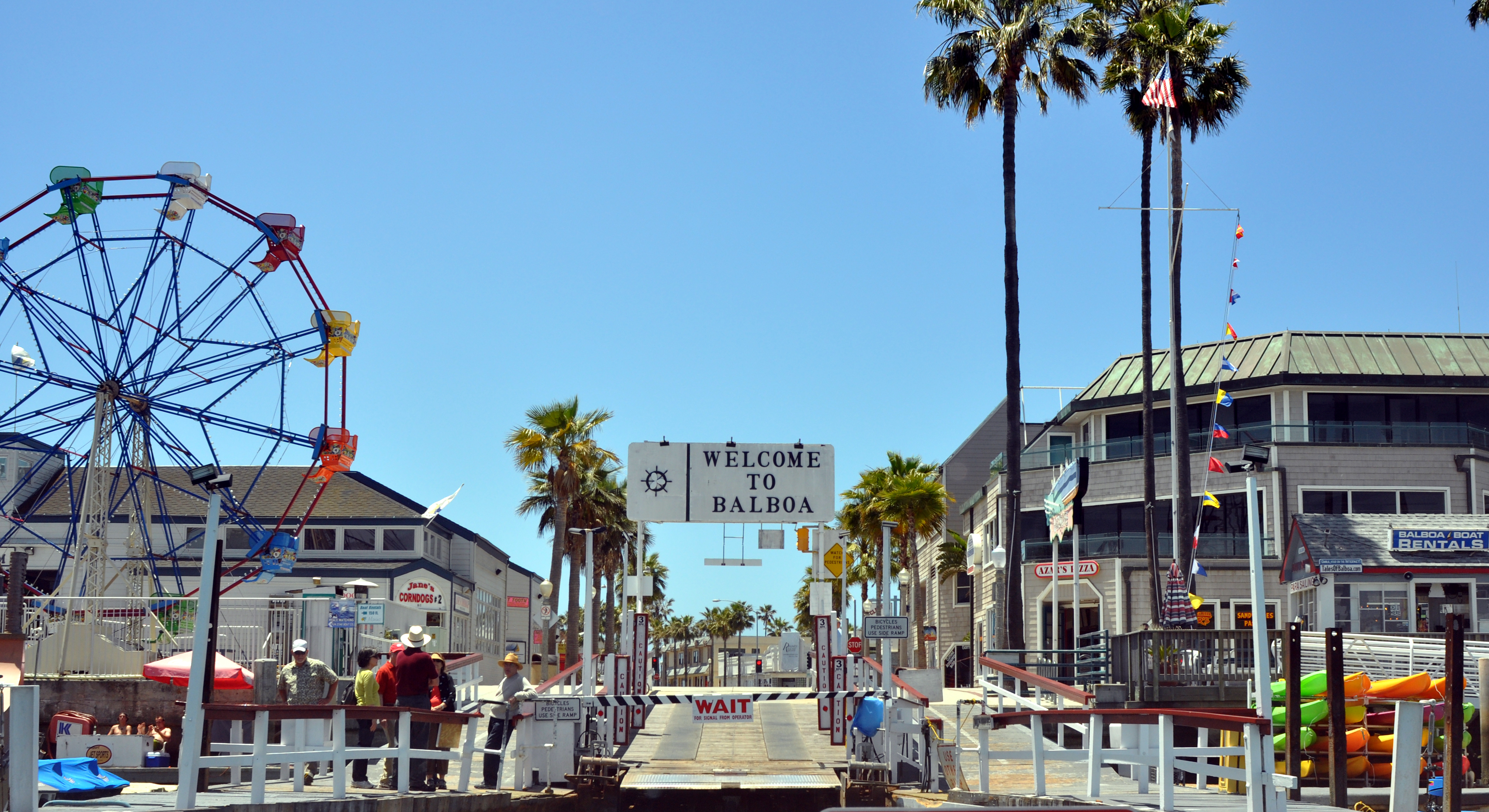
- Interactive map of Balboa Fun Zone
- Location: Newport Beach, Orange County, California, United States
- Coordinates: 33°36′10″N 117°53′56″W
- Opened: 1936
- Website: Official website

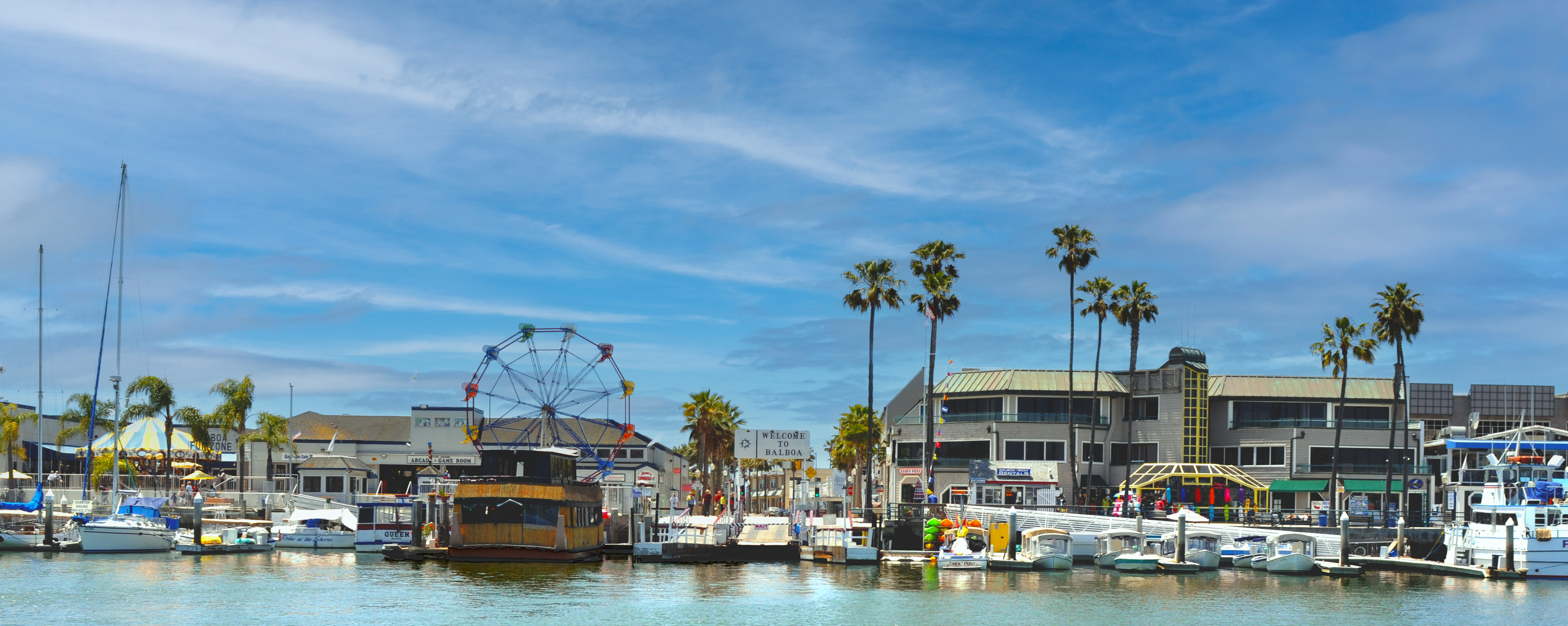
The Balboa Fun Zone.

The Balboa Fun Zone is a family destination located on the Balboa Peninsula in the city of Newport Beach, Orange County, California. The Balboa Fun Zone offers both an ocean and harbor experience for an estimated seven million annual visitors to Newport Beach.

== History ==
The Fun Zone was built in 1936 by Al Anderson featuring a small beach and a 45’ Ferris Wheel as the main attractions. In 1986, Jordan Wank rebuilt the entire area and re-opened it. In 1988, Doo & Sons owned the Balboa Fun Zone, but they walked away after not receiving zoning permits to develop the property into a mixed use of retail and housing. The property languished for several years and the area went into decline.

In 1994, the Balboa Fun Zone was purchased by former employee Joe Tunstall. The Fun Zone consisted of a newly restored Carousel purchased in 1985, a #5 Eli Ferris Wheel, bumper cars, Drummer Boy, and the Scary Dark Ride. There were also a few souvenir shops, restaurants, and tour boat companies offering boat rides and narrated cruises.

Tourists and residents can still enjoy harbor cruises and old-fashioned arcades on the boardwalk. The Ferris wheel is a frequently photographed night landmark on the Balboa Peninsula. The Balboa Fun Zone was purchased in December, 2005 by NHNM Property Holdings, LLC with plans to renovate the existing building, boardwalk, and waterfront.

In 2013, the Balboa Fun Zone underwent a major renaissance with the addition of three rides owned and operated by Fun Zone Entertainment, a wholly owned subsidiary of ExplorOcean. They include Ocean Motion, Fish Pipe, and Burt the Bull Shark.

In 2016, ExplorOcean merged with Discovery Cube Orange County forming OceanQuest adding new attractions and updating the property.

== Today ==
The greater Balboa Fun Zone area also includes the Balboa Village which consists of more retail shops, restaurants, several saloons, a boutique hotel, the Balboa Pier, the beach, and the boardwalks along both the beach and the harbor fronts.

Ocean Motion is an 18’ tall bungee ride that allows people to jump and flip through the air in complete safety, the ride Happy Swing is an automatic swing which can hold up to six people, and Coconut Climb, multiple fake coconut trees with holds for Balboa Fun Zone guests to race on.

In September 2021, Chartwell Real Estate Development purchased the area from OceanQuest after the company ran into financial struggle during the COVID-19 pandemic. Chartwell real estate under the Pyle family, the company seeks to further the revitalization of the Balboa Fun Zone.

The Balboa Fun Zone also features a raised patio open to the public offering views of Newport Harbor. The patio is handicap accessible from East Bay Avenue.

In 1959, Richard Prather set parts of his book Over Her Dear Body in the Fun Zone. "On my right.... was a small sandy beach, a few feet beyond it the color and movement of the Balboa Fun Zone." In 1998, Japanese musician hide filmed the music video for his song "Hurry Go Round" at the Fun Zone and at the Balboa Pier. In 2013, American hip hop recording artist Childish Gambino recorded the music video for his song 3005 entirely on the Ferris wheel here.

The Fun Zone has restaurants such as the iconic Cape Cod style Balboa Pavilion built in 1905, several souvenir stores, and a boardwalk. The nearby Balboa Theater on Balboa Boulevard is set to be renovated by the Balboa Theater Foundation in 2014.

== Transportation ==
The 130-foot (40 m) long Catalina Flyer passenger ferry ship also operates out of the Pavilion located in the Balboa Fun Zone. With room for 500 passengers and having a top speed of 32 knots, the Flyer arrives in the City of Avalon on Catalina Island in only 75 minutes from departure. This is the largest passenger ferry boat on the west coast.

The Balboa Auto Ferry carries passengers and cars 900 feet (270 m) from nearby Balboa Island to the Balboa Fun Zone. It operates 20 hours a day during the summer months and transports an estimated 1.6 million passengers per year. The small ferry which transports three automobiles and up to about 100 people per three-minute trip.
