= Ruby's Diner =

Casual dining restaurant chain primarily in California, USA

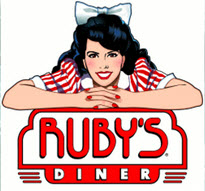
- Type: Private
- Industry: Restaurant
- Genre: Casual dining
- Theme: 1940s and '50s
- Founded: December 7, 1982; 43 years ago Newport Beach, California, U.S.
- Founders: Doug Cavanaugh; Ralph Kosmides
- Headquarters: Irvine, California, U.S.
- Number of locations: 15
- Area served: California, Nevada, and New Jersey
- Key people: Doug Cavanaugh, CEO; Ralph Kosmides, Chief administrative and development officer
- Parent: Ruby's Hospitality Group IP, LLC
- Website: www.rubys.com

Ruby's Diner is a California-based U.S. chain of casual dining restaurants founded in 1982. The original location was a converted bait shack at the end of the Balboa Pier in Newport Beach. The restaurants are designed with a 1940s and '50s atmosphere. As of 2024, most locations are in Southern California, but there are also locations in Atlantic City, New Jersey, and in Harry Reid International Airport.

== History ==
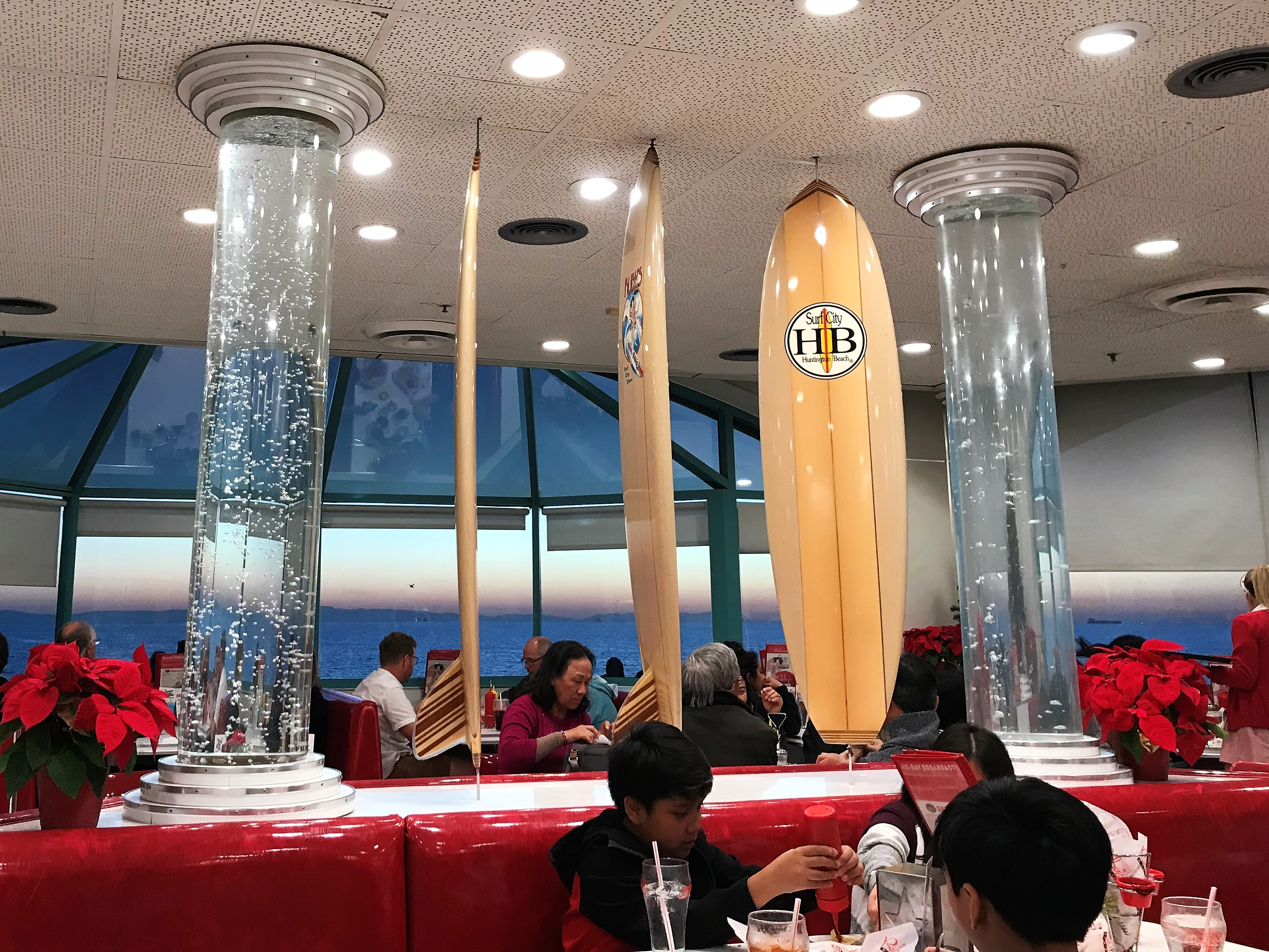
Interior Ruby's Diner Huntington Beach at sunset

The first Ruby's Diner opened on December 7, 1982, in a converted bait shop at the end of the Balboa Pier in Newport Beach, California. On that day, founders Doug Cavanaugh and Ralph Kosmides worked the grill and the cashier station and earned a total of $63. The restaurant was named after Cavanaugh's mother, and her likeness appears in the logo and other advertising material; a copy of her high school graduation photo is placed next to the register in every location.

The original Ruby's Diner on the Balboa Pier

The original Ruby's diner location still stands at the end of Balboa Pier. The restaurant formerly operated further pier locations in Huntington Beach, Malibu, Oceanside, and Seal Beach, but these locations have since been closed.

In the 2010s, Ruby's experimented with converting some locations, including Costa Mesa, to a fast casual 1960s Googie theme called "Ruby's Dinette", a change that included ordering at the counter rather than at the table. The experiment was dubbed a failure, and the locations were converted back to the original format.

Ruby's filed for bankruptcy in 2018, and a franchisee provided a cash infusion. Cavanaugh and Kosmides were sued in 2021 by a bankruptcy court trustee, who accused the pair of loaning themselves money from Ruby's and using Ruby's personnel while pursuing other business ventures.

== See also ==
- List of hamburger restaurants
- List of diners
