= Secretary of the California State Senate =

The Secretary of the California Senate is a nonpartisan officer of the Senate and is elected at the beginning of each two-year session. The secretary's primary role is the chief parliamentarian of the Senate (Senate Rule 9, Standing Rules of the Senate. See S.R. 4, 2007-08 Regular Session). The secretary also oversees the clerical workforce on the floor of the California State Senate. This workforce includes staff responsible for producing the daily files, histories, and journals of the Senate, as well as clerks that amend, engross, and enroll bills. The secretary is also responsible for recording votes on the Senate floor.

The secretary is one of three non-member officers selected for each two-year session; the body also appoints a chaplain and sergeant-at-arms. (California's Legislature (2006 edition), California State Assembly: Sacramento. p. 149)

The current secretary of the Senate is Erika Contreras, who was first elected on December 3, 2018.

== Former Secretaries ==
- The first woman to serve as secretary of the Senate was Grace Stoermer. She was appointed assistant secretary in 1919 and served one term as secretary in 1921.
- The longest-serving secretary of the Senate was Joseph Beek, who served from 1919 to 1968 (with the exception of 1921, when he did not serve).
- Rick Rollens was appointed in 1991.
- Gregory P. Schmidt served from 1996 to 2014.

== Sources and more information ==
- Entire text of California's Legislature book is posted online here
- California Senate web site. Contains links to Secretary's homepage
- Rules of the Senate (Senate Resolution 4, 2007-08 Regular Session)
