= Balboa Pier =

Ocean pier in Newport Beach, California

Coordinates: 33°36′03″N 117°54′00″W

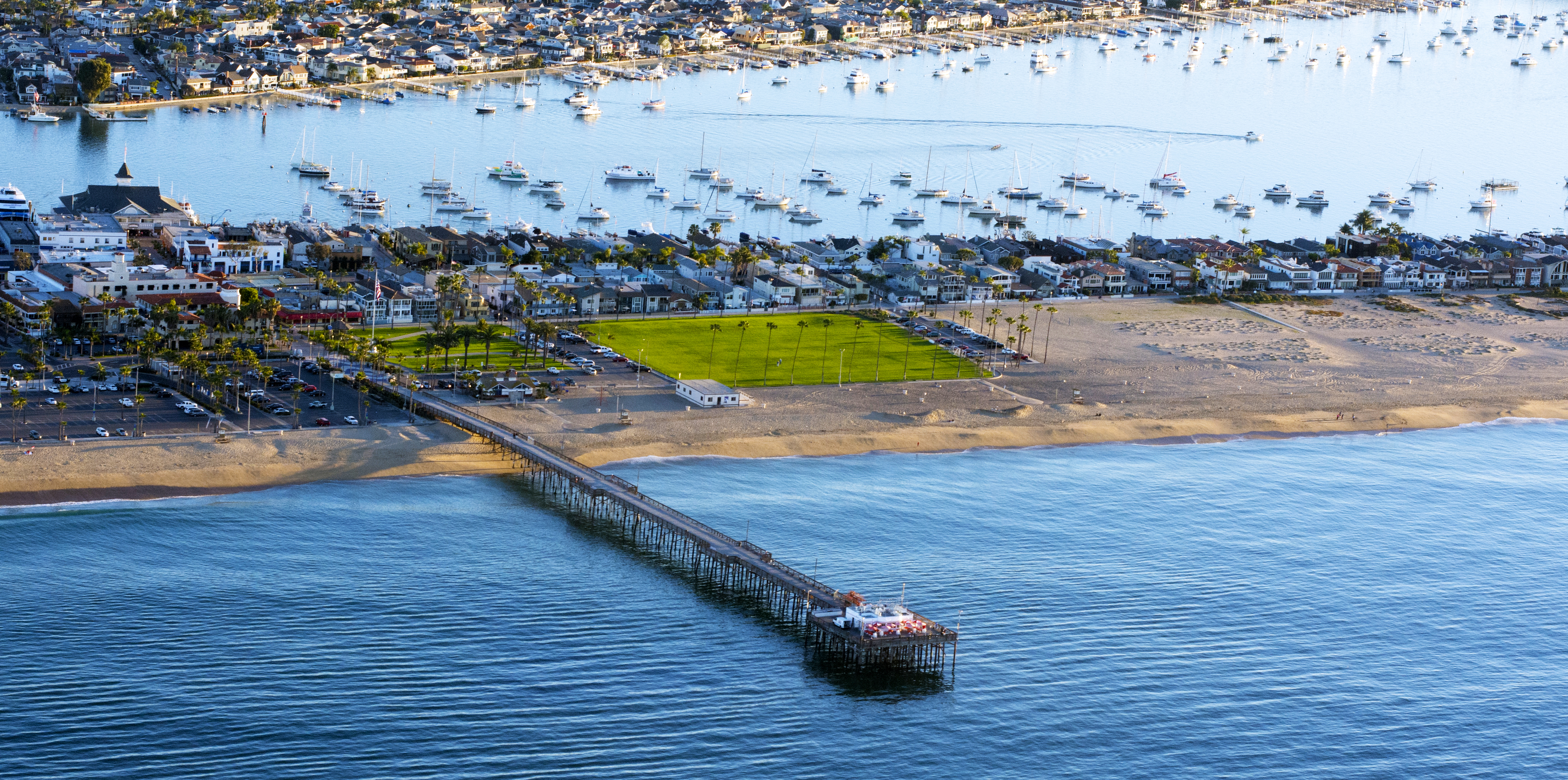
Balboa Pier, Newport Beach, February 14, 2015

The Balboa Pier is one of two piers in the city of Newport Beach, Orange County, California. The other ocean pier on the Balboa Peninsula is the Newport Pier.

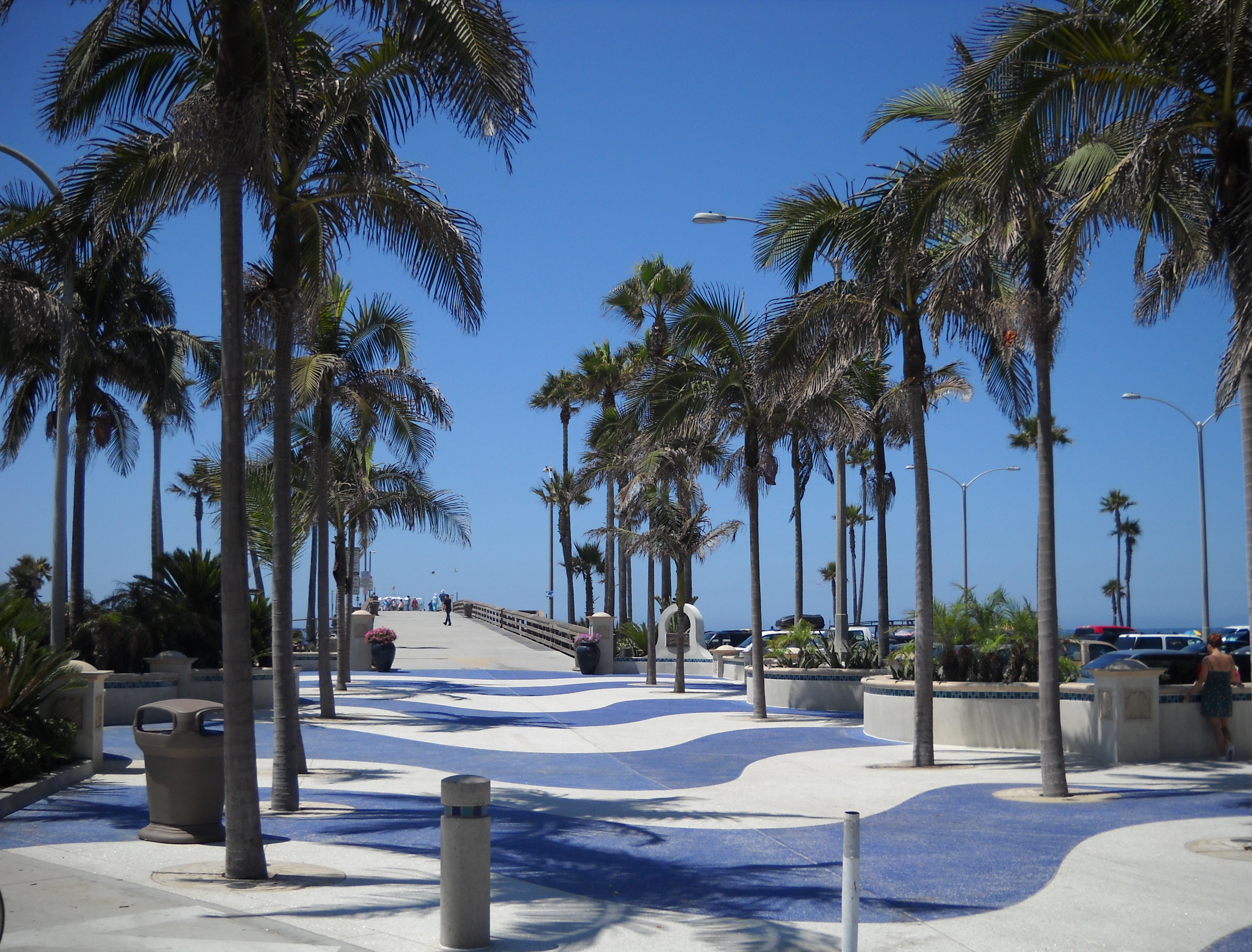
The Pier Plaza

The Balboa Pier was constructed in 1906 as a sister project of the Balboa Pavilion. The Newport Bay investment Company wanted to attract lot buyers to an undeveloped spit of sandy land now called the Balboa Peninsula. In order to do so, they built both the Balboa Pavilion and the Balboa Pier. These two structures were built to coincide with the opening of the southern terminus of the Pacific Electric Railway Red Car line from Long Beach to the Balboa Peninsula. The plan worked; multitudes of beachgoers flocked to Balboa, and many purchased lots.

The pier is a popular fishing spot. The fish caught from the pier consist mostly of mackerel and halibut. The pilings are home to a large population of starfish that feed on the large colonies of mussels growing there. Fishermen catching starfish by mistake are a relatively common sight.

In the 1980s, the first of Orange County's Ruby's Diner restaurants opened on the pier. The 1940s nostalgia-themed restaurant has since become an Orange County landmark.

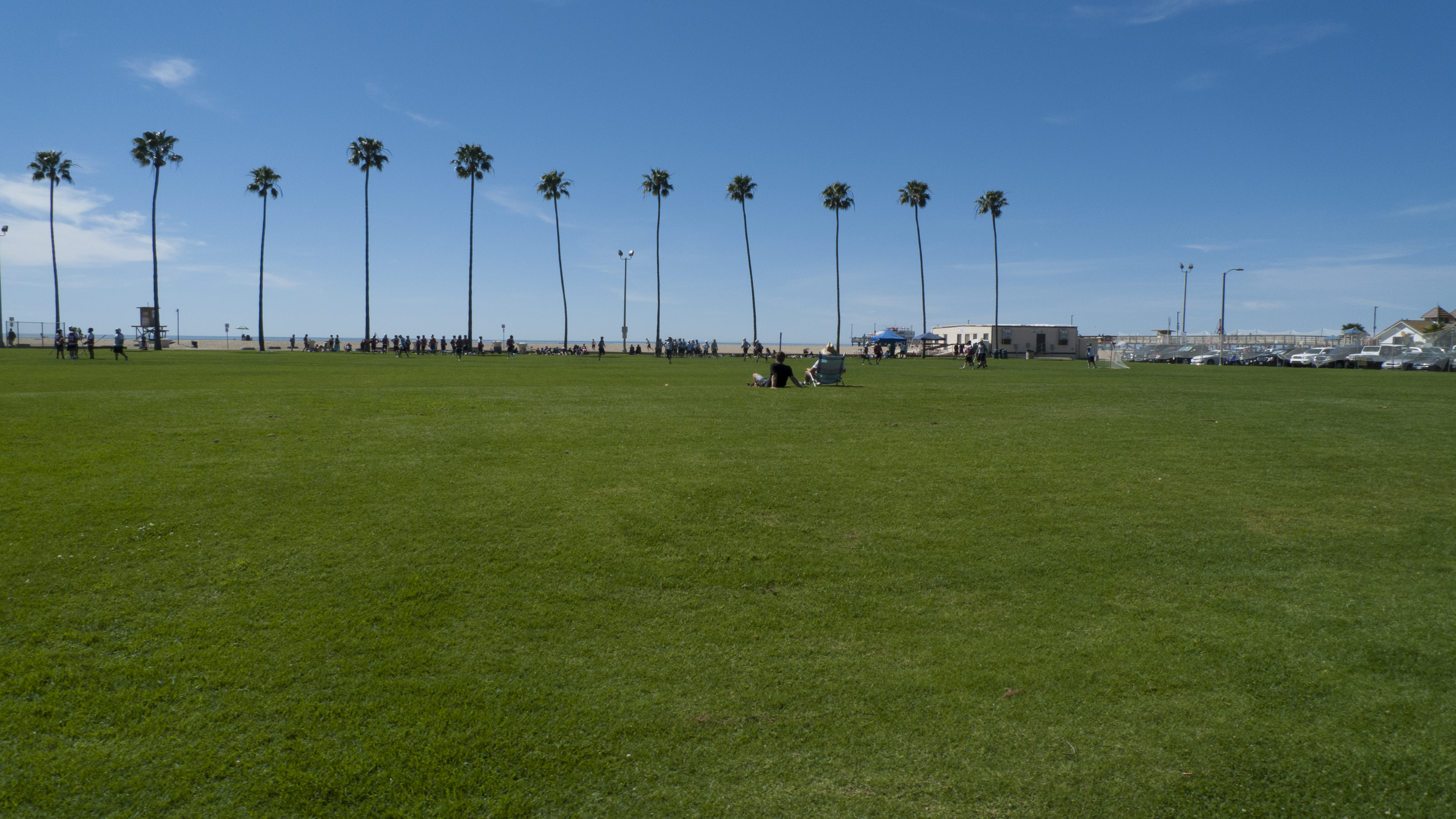
Balboa Pier Park

The pier was heavily damaged in the severe El Niño storms of 1998, which also destroyed the famous diamond-shaped Aliso Pier in Laguna Beach. One of the pillars was damaged, causing a partial collapse of one corner. The wooden posts have since been reinforced with steel sheathing and braces to prevent further damage.

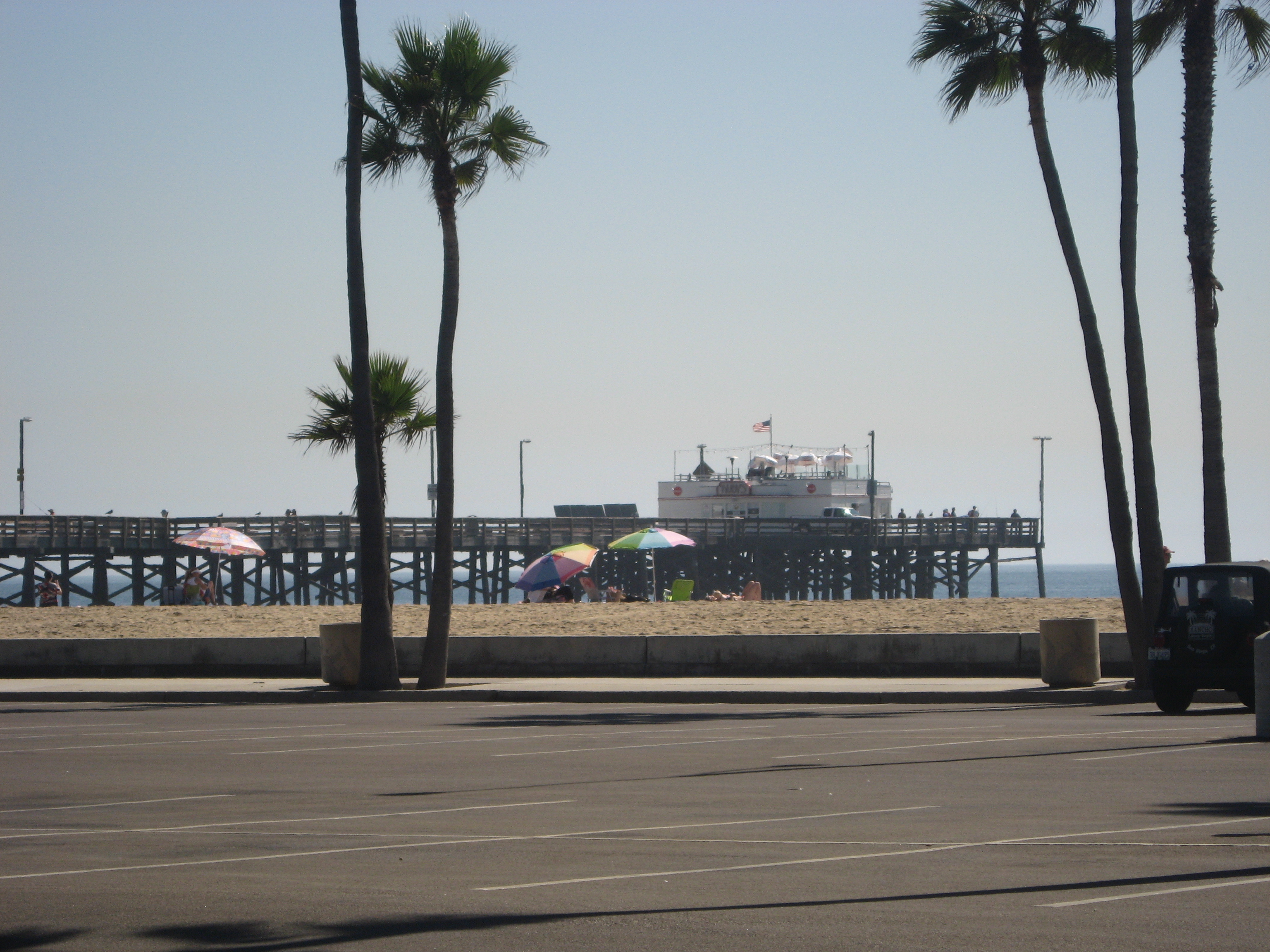
Balboa Pier

The Original Ruby's
