= Joseph Beek =

American parliamentarian (1880–1968)

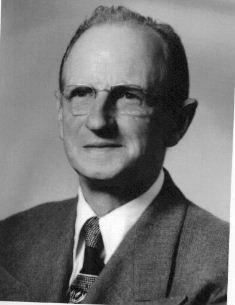
Joseph A. Beek

Joseph Allan Beek (December 16, 1880 – October 21, 1968) was the longest-serving Secretary of the Senate in California history (1919–68). The Secretary of the California State Senate is a nonpartisan officer of the Senate who advises the presiding officer and Senators on parliamentary procedures and is the chief recordkeeper of the Senate. The Secretary is elected by majority vote of the Senators for each two-year session.

Joe Beek was born in Maine and established residency in California in 1907. He attended school in Pasadena at Throop Polytechnic Institute (later renamed Caltech). Beek first served as a Senate attache in 1913. In 1917 he was elected Minute Clerk. He was first elected as Secretary in 1919 and served continuously, with the exception of 1921–22, until his death in office on October 20, 1968.

Beek authored the book "The California Legislature" in 1942. Written in narrative form, the book was part history lesson, part memoir, and part guide to the legislative process. Subsequent editions were published for the next 40 years. Beek also co-founded the American Society of Legislative Clerks and Secretaries (ASLCS) in 1943. He served as the ASLCS president for the first 25 years. Beek's years of Capitol service closely mirrored that of his colleague, Arthur Ohnimus, who served as Chief Clerk of the lower house from 1915 to 1963.

Beek was perhaps best known for his role in developing Balboa Island. He established the Balboa Island Ferry, built roads and bridges, and was one of the island's chief promoters. Beek was also Chairman of the California Small Craft Harbor Commission, was a published musician and composer, a World War II veteran, and a promoter of reforestation of hills surrounding Orange County.

== Sources ==
- The California Legislature, 1980 edition, by Joseph A. Beek (R.W. Lyons, editor), Office of State Printing, Sacramento.
- California Blue Book, State of California, 1938 and 1961 editions.
- California's Legislature (2006 edition), Appendix E, p. 269
- ASLCS web site
