= Boat parade =

Waterway event with illuminated boats

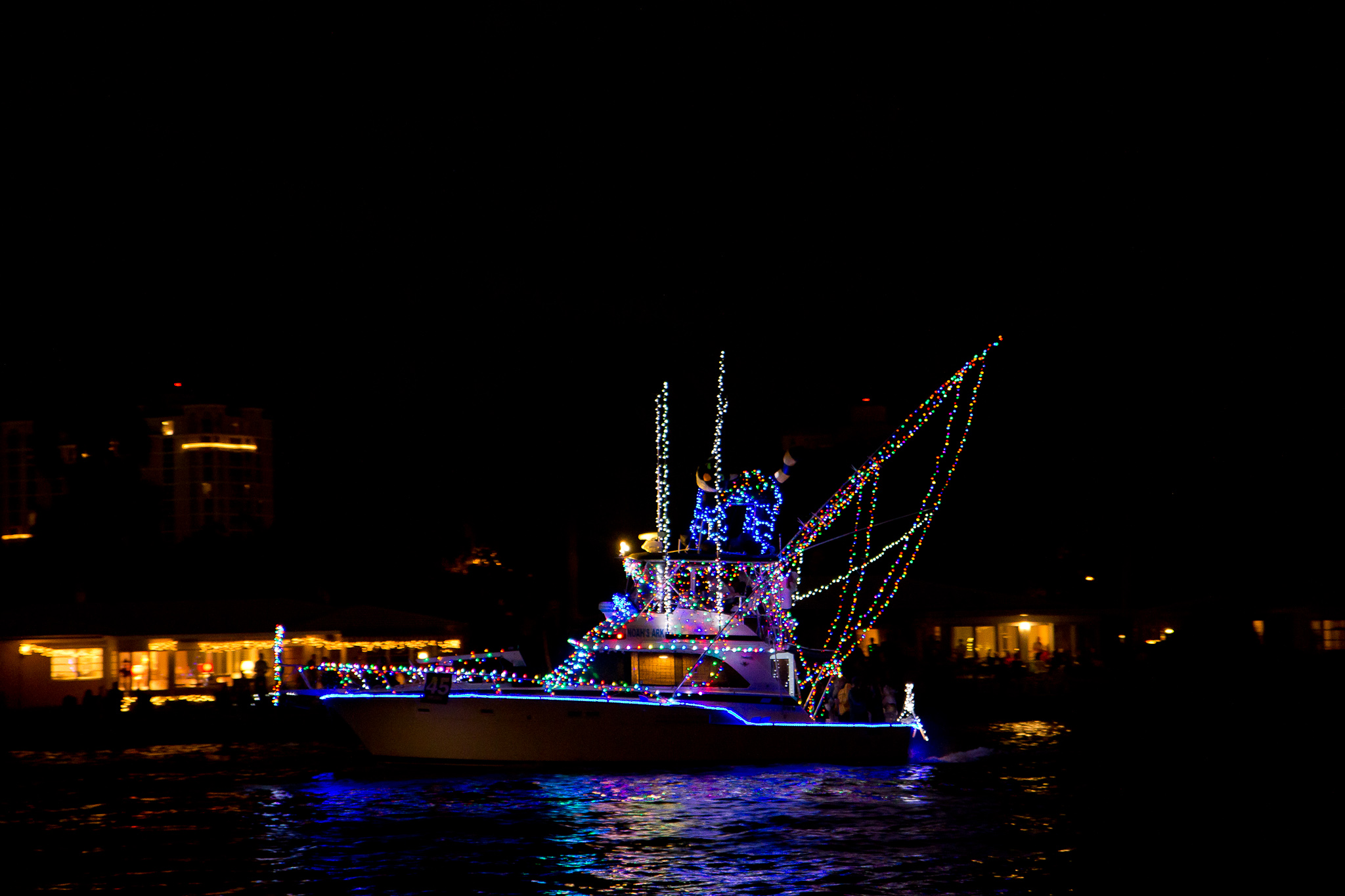
A boat in a Fort Lauderdale Boat Parade

Boat parades are a waterway event with illuminated boats. Some of the well known water parades include locations such as Walt Disney World, the Newport Beach Christmas Boat Parade, and Fort Lauderdale.

Fort Lauderdale's annual parade in December is titled the Seminole Hard Rock Winterfest Boat Parade. This signature event hosts 100 decorated vessels traveling east to the Intracoastal Waterway and heading north to Lake Santa Barbara in Pompano Beach.

Sports teams in Tampa, Florida traditionally have a boat parade down the Hillsborough River when they win a championship rather than a victory parade through the streets of the city like in most other places.

== See also ==
- Spirit Boat Procession
- Christmas ships
- Sports in the Tampa Bay area
