= Christmas ship =

Christmas Ship may refer to:

- Christmas ships, parades of decorated boats for Christmas
- The Rouse Simmons, a Christmas tree ship which sank in 1912
