= Meydenbauer Bay Park =

Park in Bellevue, Washington, United States

Coordinates: 47°36′41″N 122°12′42″W

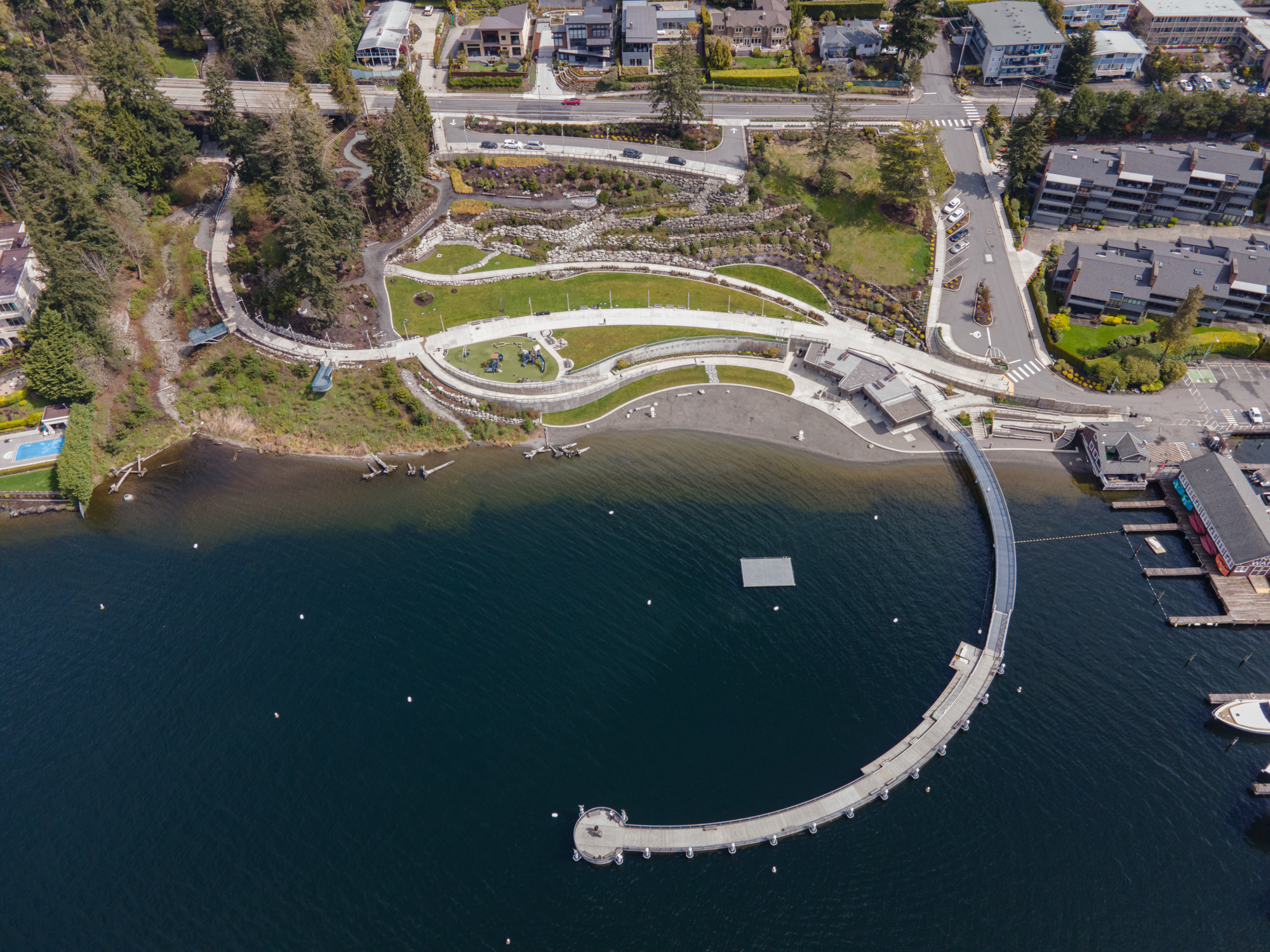
- Aerial view of Meydenbauer Bay Park
- Interactive map of Meydenbauer Bay Park
- Location: 419 98th Avenue NE; Bellevue, Washington, U.S.

Meydenbauer Bay Park (formerly Meydenbauer Beach Park) is a park located in Bellevue, Washington along Lake Washington. Named after William Meydenbauer, the recreation ground is perched steps away from nearby Meydenbauer Strand and features views, a floating pedestrian crescent pier, a kayak rental facility, a private boat dock, paved and unpaved trails, picnic tables, a playground, a restroom facility and a sand bank.

== History ==
Meydenbauer Bay Park functioned as the landing site for passenger ferries that ran between Seattle and Bellevue from the 1890s until 1921. The site was also once home to Wildwood Park, a dance hall and popular destination for Seattle residents. In 1953, it became Bellevue's first park.

In 2009, the park was one of three that welcomed the Seattle Civic Christmas Ship. A grand reopening of Meydenbauer Bay Park (previously known as Meydenbauer Beach Park) took place in March 2019 following a beach expansion and the addition of a floating 420-foot-long, crescent pedestrian pier.

== Features ==
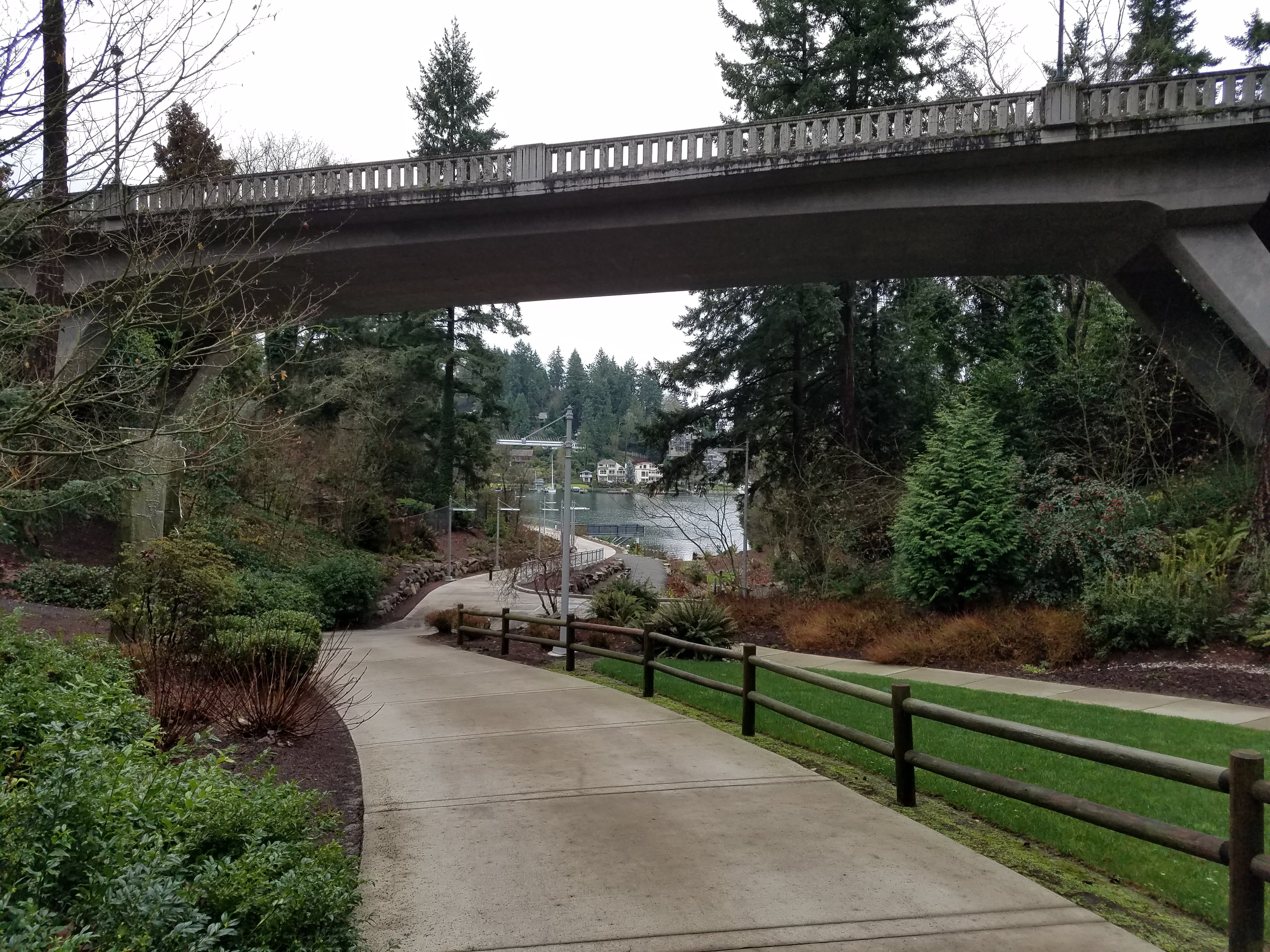
Paved walkway in Meydenbauer Bay Park, heading south towards Lake Washington

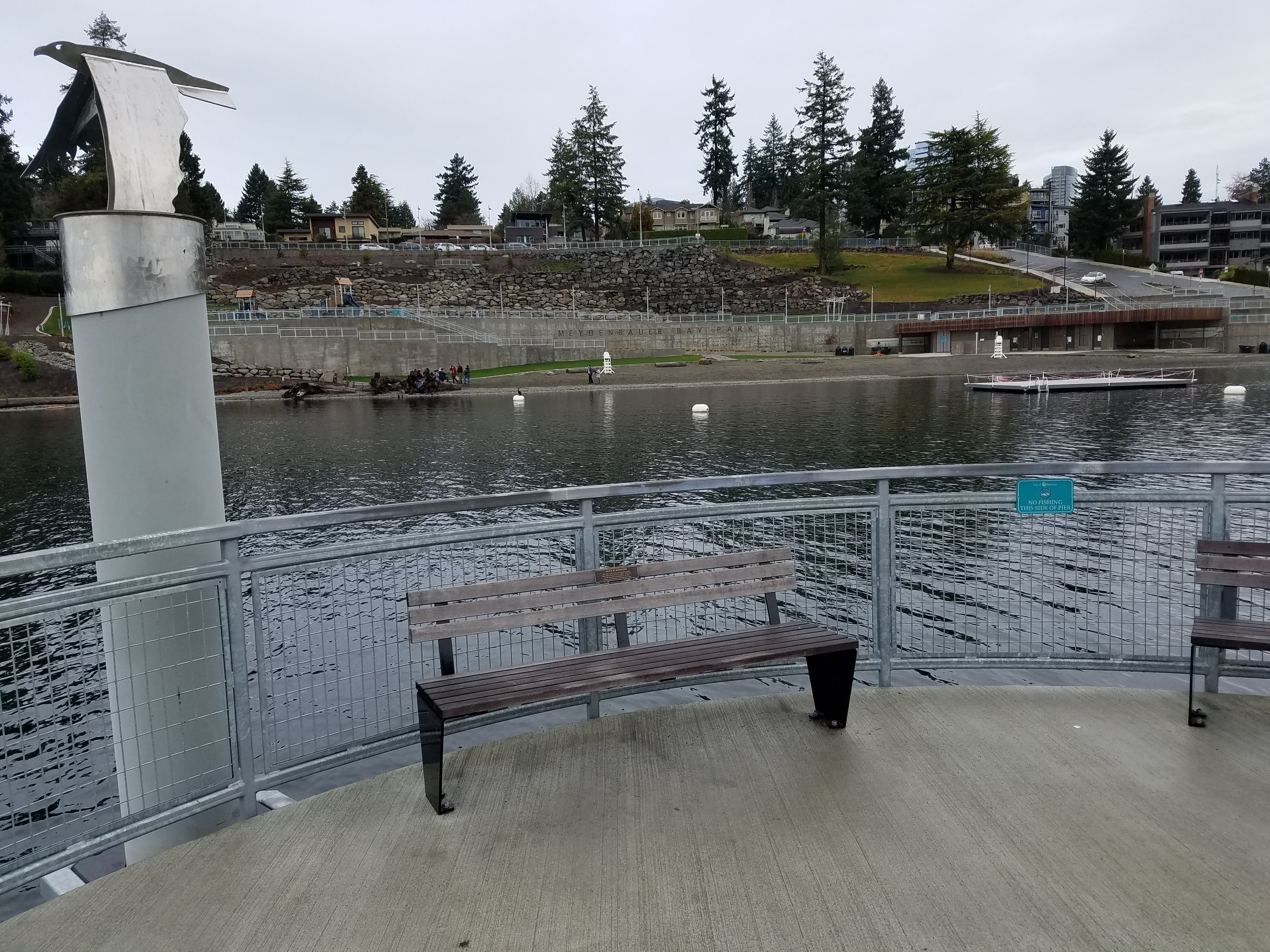
View from pedestrian pier

The park features paved and unpaved trails, landscaping with native plants, a restroom facility, a playground, picnic tables, a sand and gravel beach, and a fishing dock. Lifeguard duty is offered between late June and Labor Day.
