= Floating lantern =

Floating lantern may refer to:

- Sky lantern, a small hot air balloon made of paper that floats in the air
- Water lantern, a type of lamp that floats on the surface of the water
