= Gate of the Ghosts =

Place in Underworld, Chinese mythology

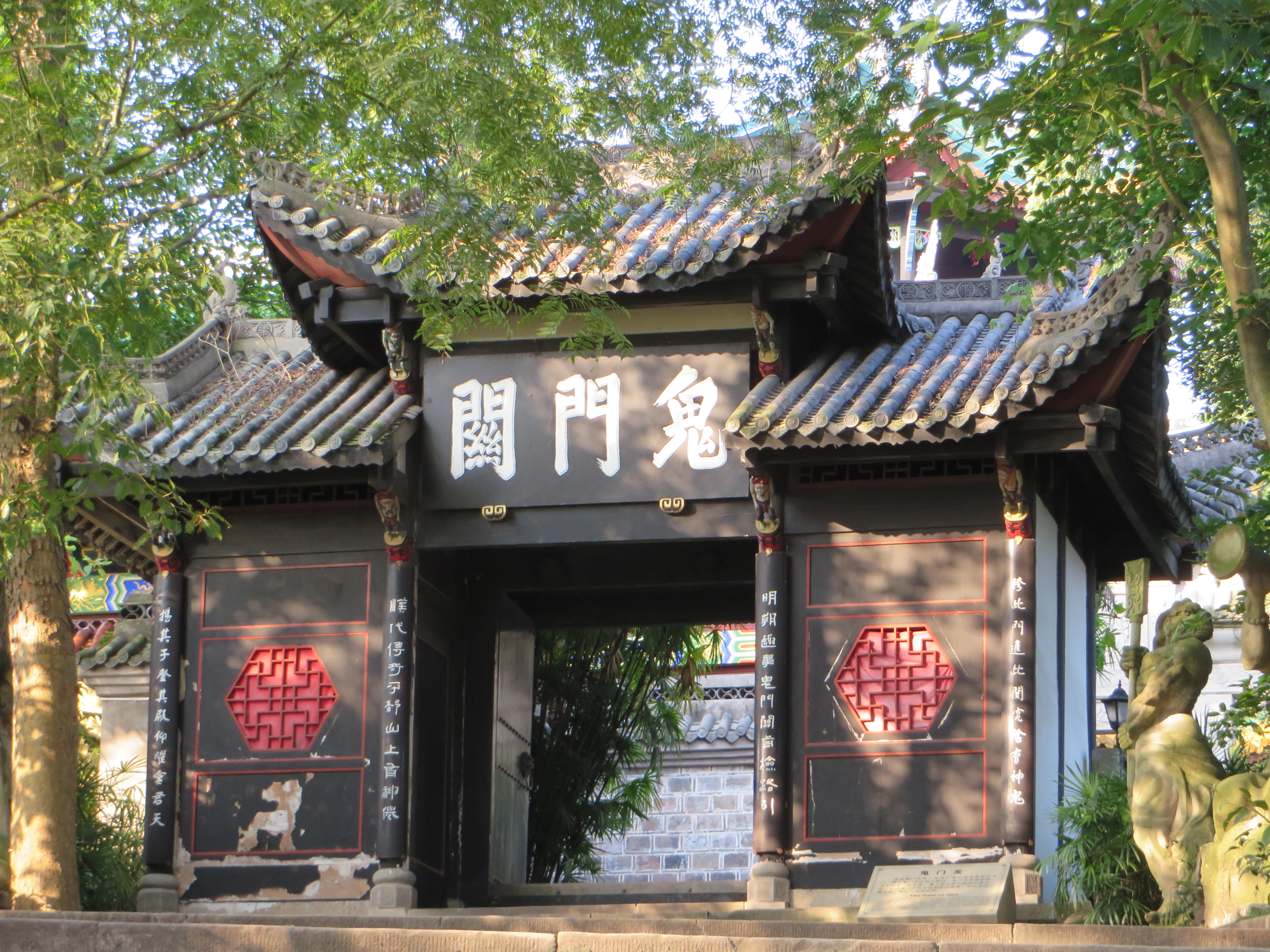
Gates of Hell at Fengdu Ghost City

The Gate of the Ghosts (simplified Chinese: 鬼门关; traditional Chinese: 鬼門關; pinyin: Guǐmén guān), or Devil's Gate, Demon Gate, known as Guimen guan in Chinese, is a pass in the Underworld in Chinese mythology.

The gate is a pailou with the words "Gate of the Ghosts" written on the horizontal plaque. Legend has it that on their way to the Ghost Country, the dead must pass through this gate.

== Use of the Gate ==
The Gate of the Ghosts plays a significant role during the Ghost Festival, which is celebrated in the seventh month of the lunar calendar in Asian countries such as China. According to Chinese mythology, every year on July 1, the King of Hell opens the Gates of the Ghosts to allow those who have suffered and been imprisoned in hell to exit there. The ghosts have a short chance to wander on earth and enjoy the living world. The gate closes at the end of July, which is therefore considered an unlucky month. Tradition says that people should neither get married or move to a new home during July.

Traditionally, during this time, people would worship and conjure their deceased relatives by burning money, ingots and paper candles, putting up river lanterns, and in other ways to pray for the blessing of the ancestors. These actions are believed to help eliminate disasters and increase blessings, or to save the dead and resolve grievances. Today, the Ghost Festival has become a traditional virtue of filial piety in Chinese culture. Inhabitants of Northern China still burn paper money during the festival to pay homage to their ancestors and express their longing for their loved ones.
