= Christmas Ships Parade =

Annual Christmas ships parade in Portland, Oregon, U.S.

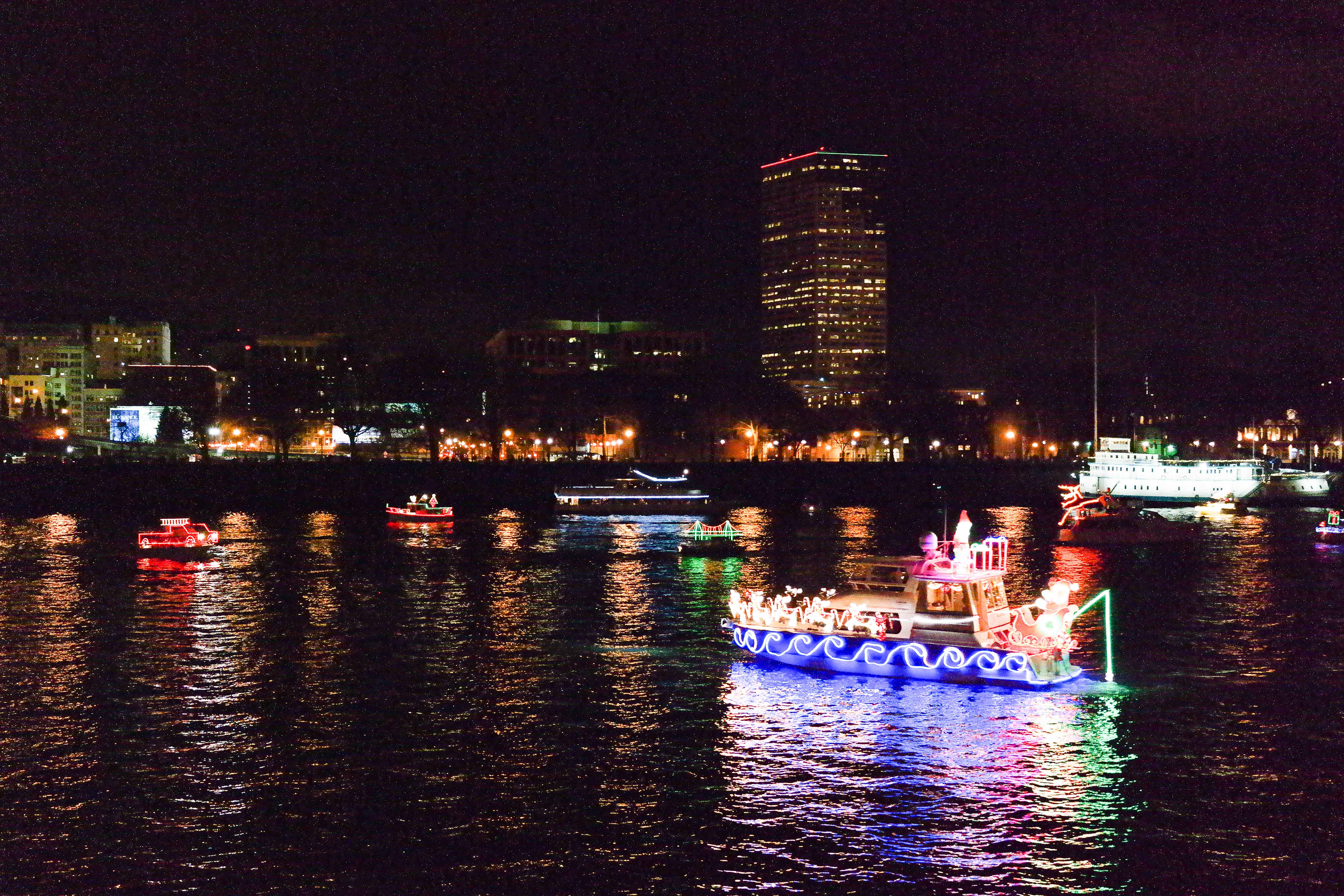
- Christmas ships in the Willamette River at downtown Portland, 2013
- Frequency: Annually
- Location: Portland, Oregon
- Country: United States
- Years active: 72
- Inaugurated: 1954
- Website: christmasships.org

The Christmas Ships Parade, or Christmas Ship Parade, is an annual Christmas ships parade in Portland, Oregon, United States. The tradition was established by a single boat in 1954. The 57th annual parade was held in 2019. A virtual event was held in 2020, during the COVID-19 pandemic.

== See also ==
- Christmas in Portland, Oregon
- Culture of Portland, Oregon
