= Masashi Sada =

- Born: Masashi Sada (佐田 雅志, Sada Masashi); 10 April 1952 (age 73); Nagasaki, Japan
- Genres: Folk-pop, kayōkyoku
- Occupation(s): Singer, composer, lyricist
- Years active: 1973–present
- Labels: Free Flight, Warner-Pioneer, FOA Records, Teichiku
- Website: www.sada.co.jp

Masashi Sada (さだ まさし, Sada Masashi; born 10 April 1952) is a Japanese singer, lyricist, and composer.

Sada formed the folk duo Grape with Masami Yoshida in 1972, and they made their debut as recording artists a year afterward. The pair rose to fame owing to the hit song "Shourou Nagashi" (精霊流し) composed by Sada, which peaked at the number-two position on the Japanese Oricon chart in 1974. They broke up in 1976, after producing some hit singles including "En-kiri Dera" (縁切寺) and "Muen Zaka" (無縁坂).

Sada released his first solo album entitled Kikyorai shortly after Grape's dissolution. Following the commercial success of the number-one hit single "Amayadori" (雨やどり, Shelter from the rain) in 1977, he enjoyed a recording career as one of the most popular Japanese male artists during the late 1970s and the first half of the 1980s.

Throughout his career as a musician, Sada released over 35 solo albums and 70 singles, and multiple live albums or compilations. Since the release of Shourou Nagashi, published in 2001, Sada has also worked as a novelist.

== Discography ==
=== Albums ===
==== Grape (with Masami Yoshida) ====
- Wasuremono (わすれもの) / Lost Property (25 August 1974)
- Seseragi (せせらぎ) / Babble (25 May 1975)
- Communication (コミュニケーション) (25 November 1975)
- Ano Koro ni Tsuite -Season of Raisin- (あの頃について -シーズン・オブ・レーズン-) (10 November 1991) / name as 'Raisin'

==== solo ====
- Kikyorai (帰去来) / I Come Back (25 November 1976)
- Kazamidori (風見鶏) / Weathercock (25 July 1977)
- Anthology (私花集) (25 March 1978)
- Yume Kuyo (夢供養) / Memorials of Dreams (10 April 1979)
- Inshoha (印象派) / Impressionists (10 October 1980)
- Utsuroi (うつろひ) / Transition (25 June 1981)
- Yume no Wadachi (夢の轍) / Rut of Dreams (11 December 1982)
- Kaze no Omokage (風のおもかげ) / Vestiges of Winds (30 November 1983)
- Glass Age (Glass Age -硝子の世代-) (12 December 1984)
- ADVANTAGE (12 June 1985)
- Jibun Shokogun (自分症候群) / Oneself Syndrome (21 December 1985)
- Yume Kaikisen (夢回帰線) / The Dream Tropic (25 July 1987)
- Kazemachi Dori no Hitobito (風待通りの人々) / People on the Street that is Waiting for Breeze (25 July 1988)
- Yume no Fuku Koro (夢の吹く頃) / Time Blowing Dream (25 January 1989)
- Yume Bakari Miteita (夢ばかりみていた) I Only Dreamed (25 February 1990)
- Yume Kaikisen II (夢回帰線II) / The Dream Tropic Second (25 August 1990)
- Kazoku no Shozo (家族の肖像) Portrait of a Family (25 July 1991)
- Honobono (ほのぼの) / Heartwarming (10 November 1992)
- Aimiteno (逢ひみての) / Rendezvous (25 October 1993)
- Omoide Dorobo (おもいで泥棒) / Burglar who Steal Dreams (25 October 1994)
- Sayonara Nippon (さよならにっぽん) / Good-bye Japan (25 October 1995)
- Furukusai Koi no Uta Bakari (古くさい恋の唄ばかり) / Just old-fashioned Love Songs (25 October 1996)
- Yumeuta (夢唄) / Dream Song (21 November 1997)
- Kokoro no Jidai (心の時代 / Period of Heart (23 September 1998)
- Toki no Sumika (季節の栖) / Habitats of Seasons (23 June 1999)
- Nihon Kaku Setsu (日本架空説) / Japan Fancied Theory (21 September 2000)
- Alstroemeria (夢百合草 (あるすとろめりあ)) (27 February 2002)
- Yume no Tsuzuki (夢のつづき) / Continuation of a Dream (26 September 2002)
- Slow Life Story (すろうらいふすとーりー) (22 October 2003)
- Koibumi (恋文) / Love Letter (22 September 2004)
- Tokoshie (とこしへ) / Forever (7 September 2005)
- Utsukushiki Nihon no Omokage (美しき日本の面影) / Beautiful Japanese Vestiges (6 September 2006)
- Mist (12 September 2007)
- Utsukushii Asa / Beautiful Morning (美しい朝) (9 June 2009)
- Yokan (予感) / Premonition (9 June 2010)
- Sada City (11 July 2011)
- Mou Kurukoro... (もう来る頃...) / Time It Will Come (13 June 2012)
- Dai Ni Gakushou (第二楽章) / The Second Movement (10 September 2014)
- Kaze no Kiseki (風の軌跡) / Track of winds (8 July 2015)
- Reborn ~Umaretate no Sada Masashi~ (Reborn～生まれたてのさだまさし～) (4 July 2018)
- Shin-Jibunfudoki I ~Boukyou~ (新自分風土記I～望郷篇～) (15 May 2019)
- Shin-Jibunfudoki II ~Mahoroba~ (新自分風土記II～まほろば篇～) (15 May 2019)
- 45th Anniversary Concert Tour 2018 Reborn-Masashi Sada (45周年記念コンサートツアー2018 Reborn ～生まれたてのさだまさし～) (26 June 2019)

== See also ==
- Nippon Cultural Broadcasting
