= Newport Beach Christmas boat parade =

Aerial views of the 2017 Newport Beach Christmas Boat Parade.

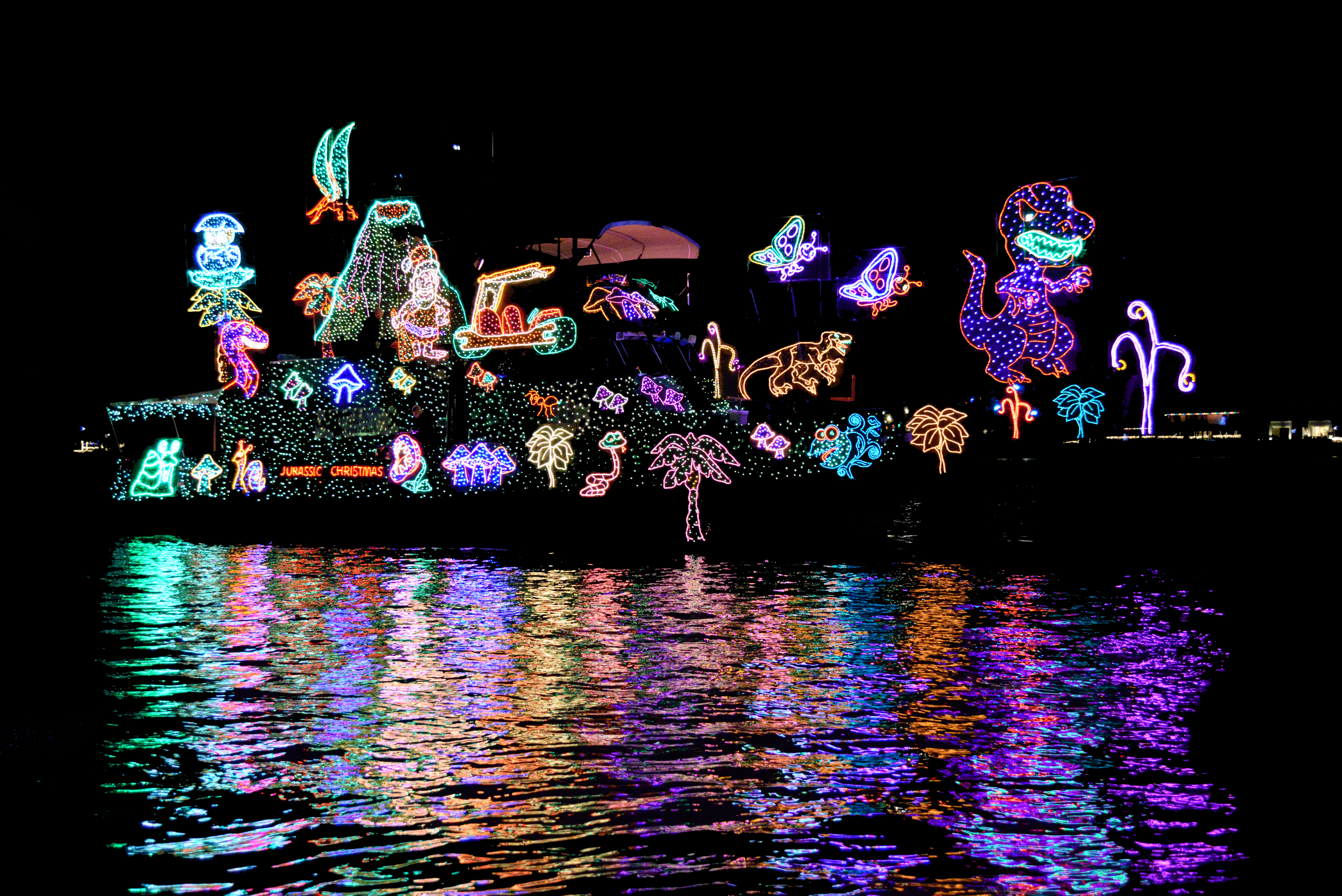
Decorated boat participating in the 2016 Newport Beach Christmas Boat Parade.

The Newport Beach Christmas Boat Parade is a Christmas ships festival in Newport Beach, California, United States, established at the turn of the 20th Century by John Scarpa and Joseph Beek.

== History ==
Scarpa, an Italian gondolier, and Beek, a key force in the early development of Balboa Island and later the founder of the Balboa Island Ferry, arrived in the Newport Harbor area in around 1907. These two men established what was then called the Tournament of Lights, an event that would continue for the next nine decades. In 1907, Scarpa began taking a group of visitors from Pasadena across the Newport bay in a gondola decorated with Japanese lanterns. One year later, on July 4, 1908, the first lighted boat parade took place. Scarpa, along with his fellow small boat operators, put together a loosely organized event consisting of nine vessels, with Scarpa's gondola followed by eight canoes, all of them illuminated by Japanese lanterns.

In 1913, Walter Gustin decided to promote the event featuring lighted boats, called the "Illuminated Water Parade". To promote participation, prizes were offered for the boats with the best decorative lighting. However, due to World War I, there was no parade for the next five years. In 1919, Beek, by now operating ferryboats like the Fat Ferry, came to revive the lighted boat parade, establishing the "Balboa Tournament of Lights" in 1921, with support from both the Island and the Peninsula. From here the festival grew, including fleets of rowboats, canoes, and small sailboats, as well as motorboats, power cruisers and large auxiliaries. By 1929, scores of decorated and illuminated power craft were towing their quota of small craft, and the tournament grew in size and elaboration each year. In 1929, Governor C. C. Young remarked, "It's one of the most beautiful things I have ever seen! I think its most charming feature is its freedom from commercialism."

With the exception of a few years during World War II, the Tournament of Lights was held every summer from 1919 until 1949. After an absence in 1948, in 1949 the Police and Fire authorities argued that the parade was drawing too many visitors to the harbor and creating heavy crowding and traffic congestion, and the event fell out of favor.

Today, the Newport Beach Christmas Boat Parade features as many as 150 boats. The parade is hosted by the Commodores Club of the Newport Beach Chamber of Commerce. In 2002, the New York Times described it as "one of the top ten holiday happenings in the nation".
