= Hurrah! Hurrah for the Christmas Ship =

Song
- Language: English
- Published: 1914
- Genre: Traditional/Family
- Composer(s): Henry S. Sawyer
- Lyricist(s): Henry S. Sawyer
- Producer(s): Chicago: McKinley Music Co.

"Hurrah! Hurrah for the Christmas Ship" was a World War I era song that encouraged kids to donate money, food, and clothing for European children affected by the war. It was written and composed by Henry S. Sawyer and produced by McKinley Music Co. in 1914.

Soon after war broke out in Europe, the editor of the Chicago Herald, James Keeley, published an appeal to American children to donate gifts to Europe's soon to be war orphans. Two hundred newspapers across the country reprinted the appeal and together, the press coordinated a humanitarian aid campaign.

Collection efforts went on for months amassing upwards of 5,000,000 items of clothing, food, and gifts. Donations were sorted, repacked, and marked for Belgium, Germany, France, Austria, Hungary, Serbia, Greece, and Russia. The Red Cross was in charge of distributing the goods.

US Army soldiers at Fort Hamilton loaded the cargo onto the US Navy's collier, the Jason, which it loaned to transport the goods. The Jason was known as both the Christmas Ship and the Santa Claus Ship.

== Lyrics ==
Come, boys and girls, just listen to This news for you and me: They're going to send a Christmas Ship Across the great blue sea! It's going to be filled with gifts For families abroad Who've suffered in this cruel war From fire, gun, and sword Now all the boys and all the girls Will ev'ry effort bend To see how many useful things They to the ship can send; But I was thinking we could do About as much real good By sending money from our banks As well as clothes and food

CHORUS

Hurrah! Hurrah for the Christmas Ship As it starts across the sea With its load of gifts and its greater load Of loving sympathy. Let's wave our hats and clap our hands As we send it on its trip; May many a heart and home be cheered By the gifts of the Christmas Ship!

The paper say there's thousands who Are homeless thro' the war; That Santa Claus can't half get 'round As he has done before. So this year we'll help Santa Claus Remember each poor child, And bring a smile of happiness Amid those terrors wild. Let Dorothy and Mary send A pair of shoes apiece, And little Jane can send the dime She got from Aunt Bernice, While Tom and all the boys and girls Are eager to pitch in To make this Christmas time the best The world has ever seen.

REPEAT CHORUS

== See also ==
- Downloadable PDF of original sheet music from York University's Scott Library Special Collections - Sheet Music Collection. Hurrah! Hurrah for the Christmas Ship!
