= Spirit Boat Procession =

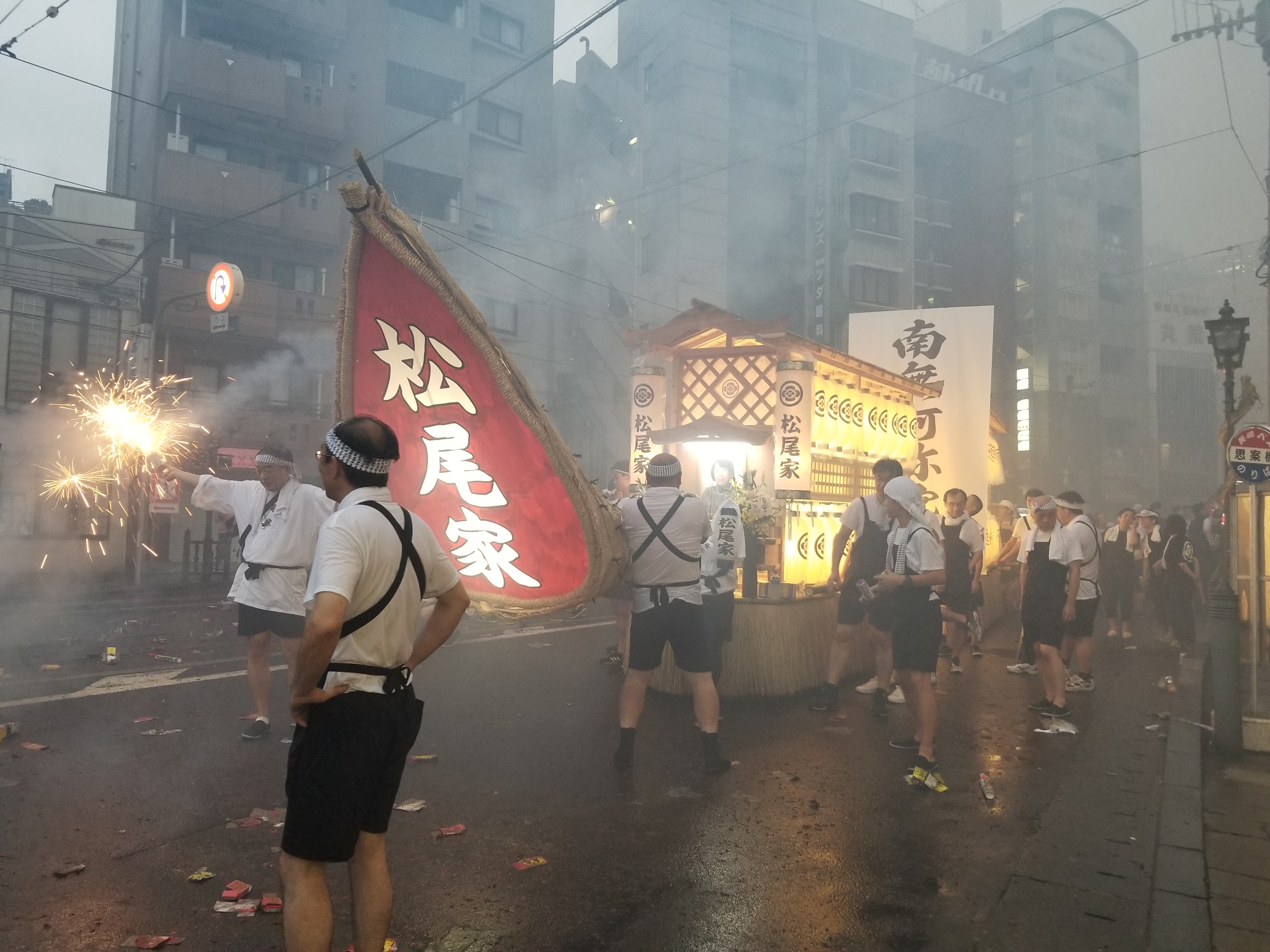
A large boat being pushed, 2017

The Spirit Boat Procession (精霊流し, Shōrō nagashi) is an event celebrated in various places in Nagasaki prefecture, Japan. It is part of the Bon Festival. During the event, the souls of the deceased are mourned.

Several scenes of the Spirit Boat Procession in 2018

== Description ==
The procession takes place on August 15 of every year. During the procession, people float boats which are said to be carrying the spirits of the deceased down the river. The spirits are said to be sent to Sukhavati. It is done as an act of mourning by those who have lost a family member in the past year, though people who are not mourning participate as well.

As with many other Japanese festivals, people carry firecrackers and gongs, and often sound off with kakegoe. Some boats are built up to look like festival floats, and many tourists come to see the event. Despite the atmosphere, the procession is actually a Buddhist event of mourning the deceased. At one time the boats were floated off into the ocean, but in recent years the boats are retrieved before they go out that far so as to prevent polluting the ocean.

In 2010, it was reported that more than 180,000 people had attended the event.

=== Boats ===
The boats are called shōrōbune (精霊船). The boats are said to carry the souls of the deceased on them. The boats are mainly built by people who have lost a family member in the last year, though they are also built by others.

The boats can be built from a quantity of different supplies and no particular one is preferred. Bamboo and grass are often used, though cogongrass is popular in Saikai, Nagasaki, and some other people use hardened corrugated cardboard. People who are mourning decorate the boat with the family crest, put a portrait of the deceased and the mortuary tablet on the boat, and also sometimes use a token that exemplifies the person (e.g. a shogi player may have a shogi piece on the boat). Those who are not mourning generally build small laced rafts, and set O-Bon lanterns, fruit or non-natural flowers on them instead. Boats made by individuals or family members are generally between 1 and 2 meters. Often boats also have a sail with sutras for Buddha and Kannon.

Larger boats, called moyaibune, are created and sent out by neighborhoods, local councils or organizations. Prior to the 1950s, these sorts of boats were more popular, as individual family boats are expensive and considered relatively luxurious. Neighborhood boats are usually adorned with the town icon, and paper lanterns with family crests are hung off the boat.

In more recent years, less traditional boats have gained popularity. These boats are discussed to as kawari shorobune (変わり精霊船) and are becoming progressively popular. An example of such a boat would be a yacht-shaped boat for someone who was an avid sailor.

== Origin ==
There are various theories as to the festival's origin, though it is believed to be strongly influenced by a similar Chinese festival. The meaning of the firecrackers that are fired on the side of the road leading up to the launching place comes from a Chinese idea on how to ward off evil spirits, and by passing the boats by, they are cleansed.

== Song ==
Masashi Sada, a native of Nagasaki, wrote a song called Shoro nagashi that is essentially about the festival. It was recorded along with Masami Yoshida under the band name Grape and was released in 1974. At the end of 2009 Sada's father died, and in 2010 he and his family sailed a boat in honor of his father. Footage was broadcast around the country.

== See also ==
- Bon Odori
- Obon
- Tōrō nagashi
