= Christmas ships =

Parades of decorated boats for Christmas

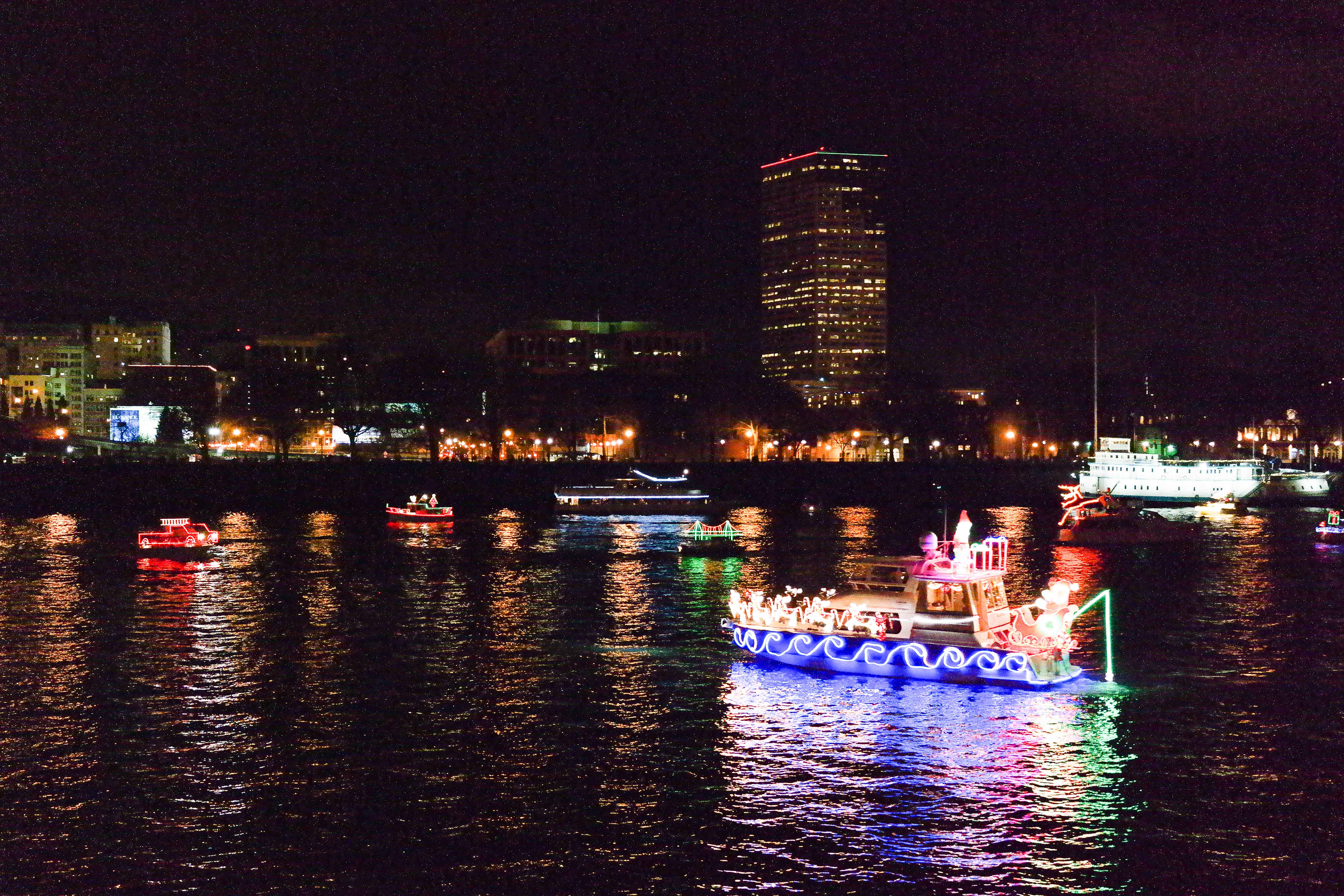
Christmas Ships Parade in Portland, Oregon, in 2013.

Christmas ships are boat parades held at Christmastime, typically featuring boats festooned with Christmas lights or winter/holiday decorations.

In the United States in the nineteenth century, German and Irish immigrants shipped trees from Michigan and Wisconsin down to Chicago via boat to satisfy the large demand for Christmas trees. Among these ships was the Rouse Simmons, a Christmas tree ship which sank in Lake Michigan in 1912. Christmas tree shipping continued to occur in Chicago into the 1930s. Ships laden with Christmas gifts for distribution were also referred to as "Christmas ships" in the early twentieth century, even inspiring a popular World War I-era song, "Hurrah! Hurrah for the Christmas Ship".

Seattle, Washington held its first Christmas ship parade in 1941, but without any lights on the boats due to blackout regulations during World War II. From 1949 to 1993, Seattle's Christmas ship festival was led by the Seattle Department of Parks. Since 1994, it has been led by Argosy Cruises, and sails multiple times daily during December. A lead boat travels to waterfront destinations on Lake Washington and in Puget Sound, and a choral group on the boat sings a program of Christmas carols to the audience on shore. Private boats decorated for the season may follow the lead boat.

Portland, Oregon has hosted a Christmas ships festival since 1954 on the Columbia and Willamette Rivers. The boat parades occur most nights for several weeks in December.

Newport Beach, California hosts the Newport Beach Christmas boat parade. Other cities which host Christmas ships festivals include Philadelphia, San Diego, Daytona Beach, Florida, Delray Beach, Florida, Fort Lauderdale, Florida, Yorktown, Virginia, Biloxi, Mississippi, Gulf Shores, Alabama, St. Helens, Oregon, and Port Moody, British Columbia. Seward, Alaska once held a Christmas ships festival, as well.
