= Water lantern =

Type of lamp that floats on water

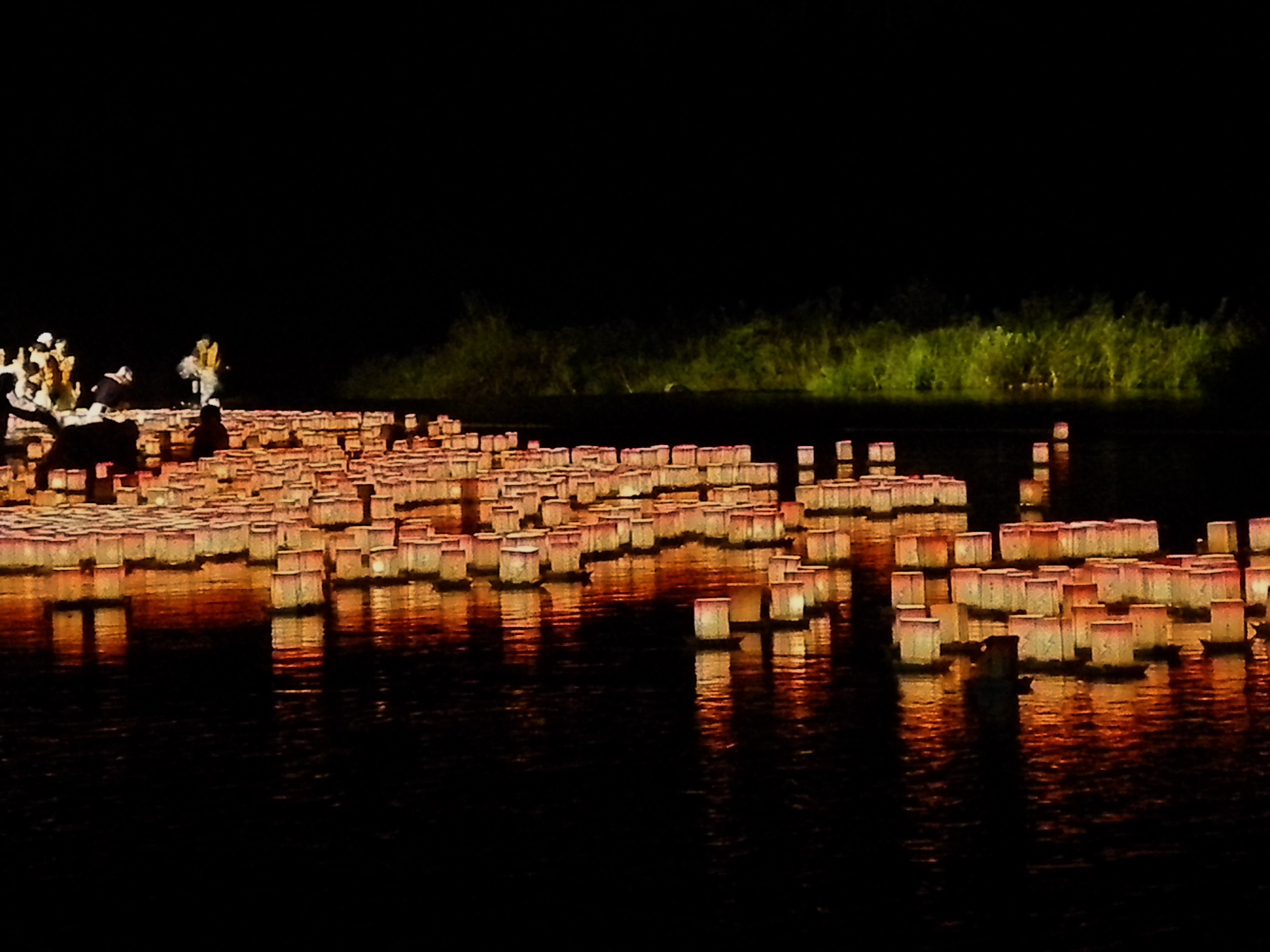
Floating lanterns at the Eihei-ji temple, Japan

A water lantern is a type of lamp that floats on the surface of the water. It is also known as a floating lamp, river lamp or lake lamp, depending on the water body on which it is floated. The water lantern originated in India and later spread to other parts of South Asia, Southeast Asia and East Asia due to the influence of Hindu-Buddhist cultural diffusion.

== South Asia and Southeast Asia ==
The water lamps in the Indian culture are seen in various traditional festivals and sacrifices, especially the festivals on the full moon day or Purnimas like the festivals on Kartik Purnima, across South and Southeast Asia including the Vesak Day, Deepavali, Boita Bandana, Loi Krathong, Bon Om Touk, Songkran Festival, Lantern Festival, Mid-Autumn Festival, Water Festival, etc., have simple lamps and are made of plant materials such as flowers and leaves. The main meaning of the water lights in these areas is to worship the gods, send away the disasters, and welcome happiness. Some young men and women will also pray for a good marriage with water lamps. Water lanterns are also believed to guide the souls in the water.

=== Vietnam ===
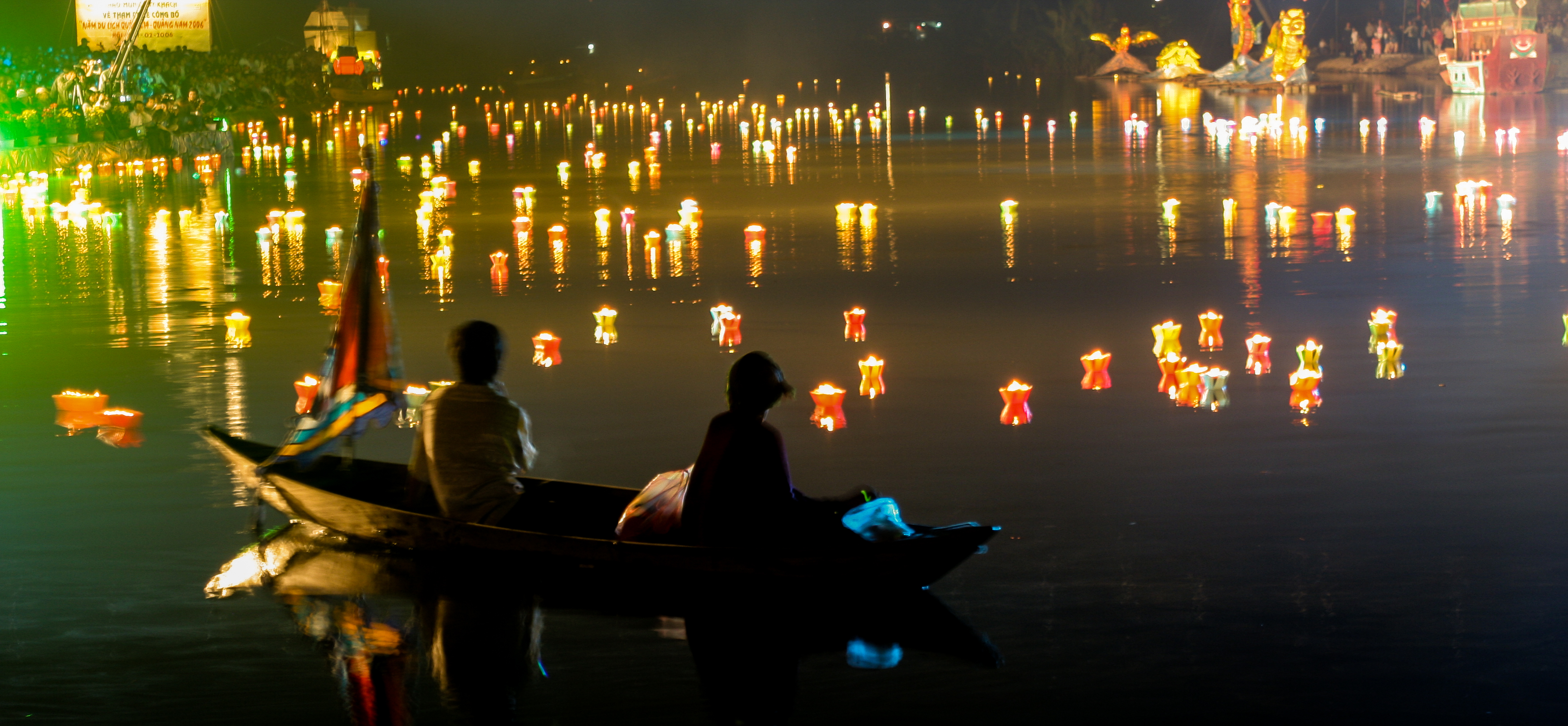
Releasing water lanterns in Hội An, Vietnam

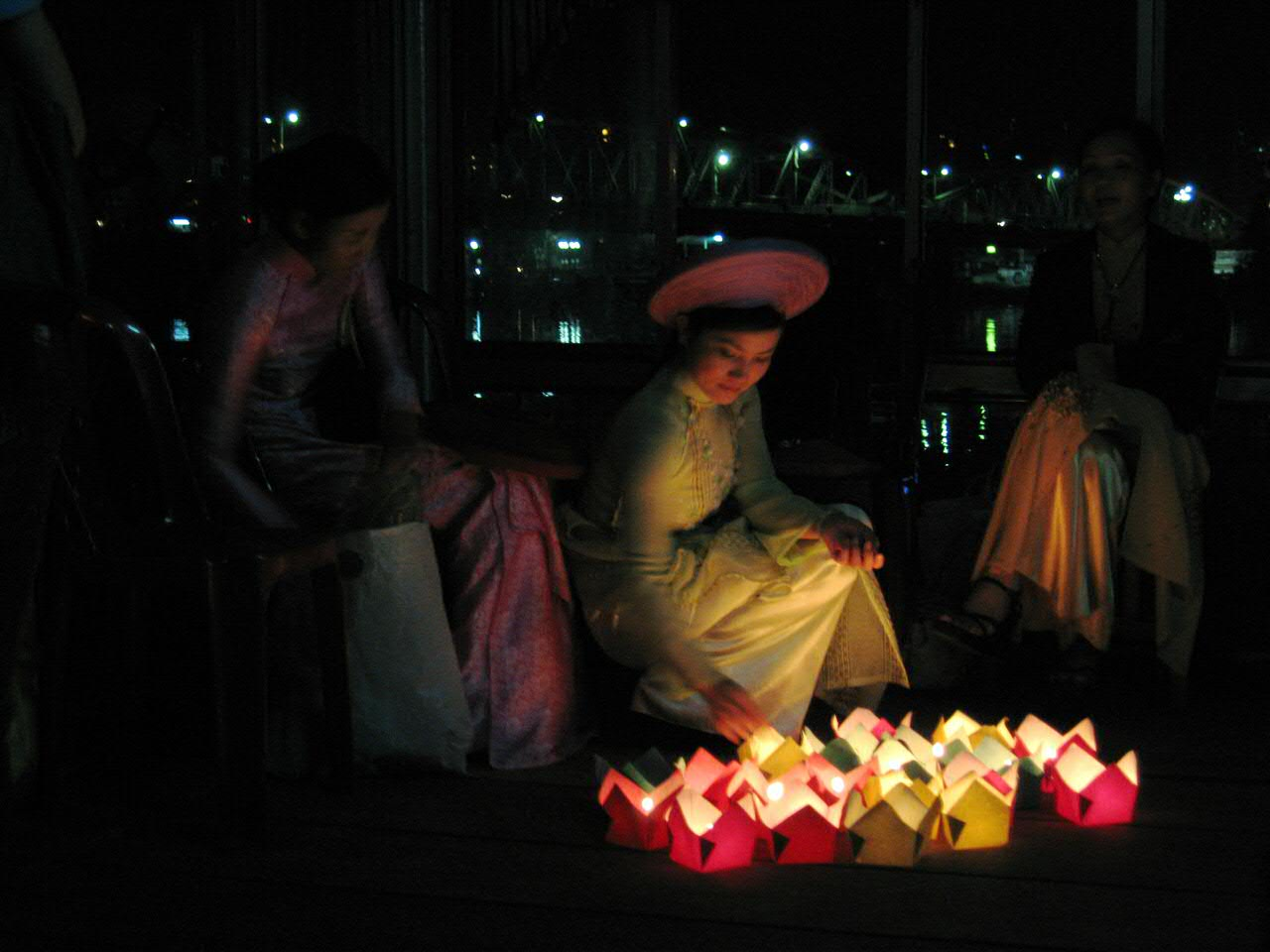
People release water lanterns in the Hương River, Huế

In Vietnam, water lanterns are known as đèn hoa đăng, đèn giấy, released regularly in Hội An on the 1st, 14th, 15th day of the Vietnamese calendar and every Saturday.

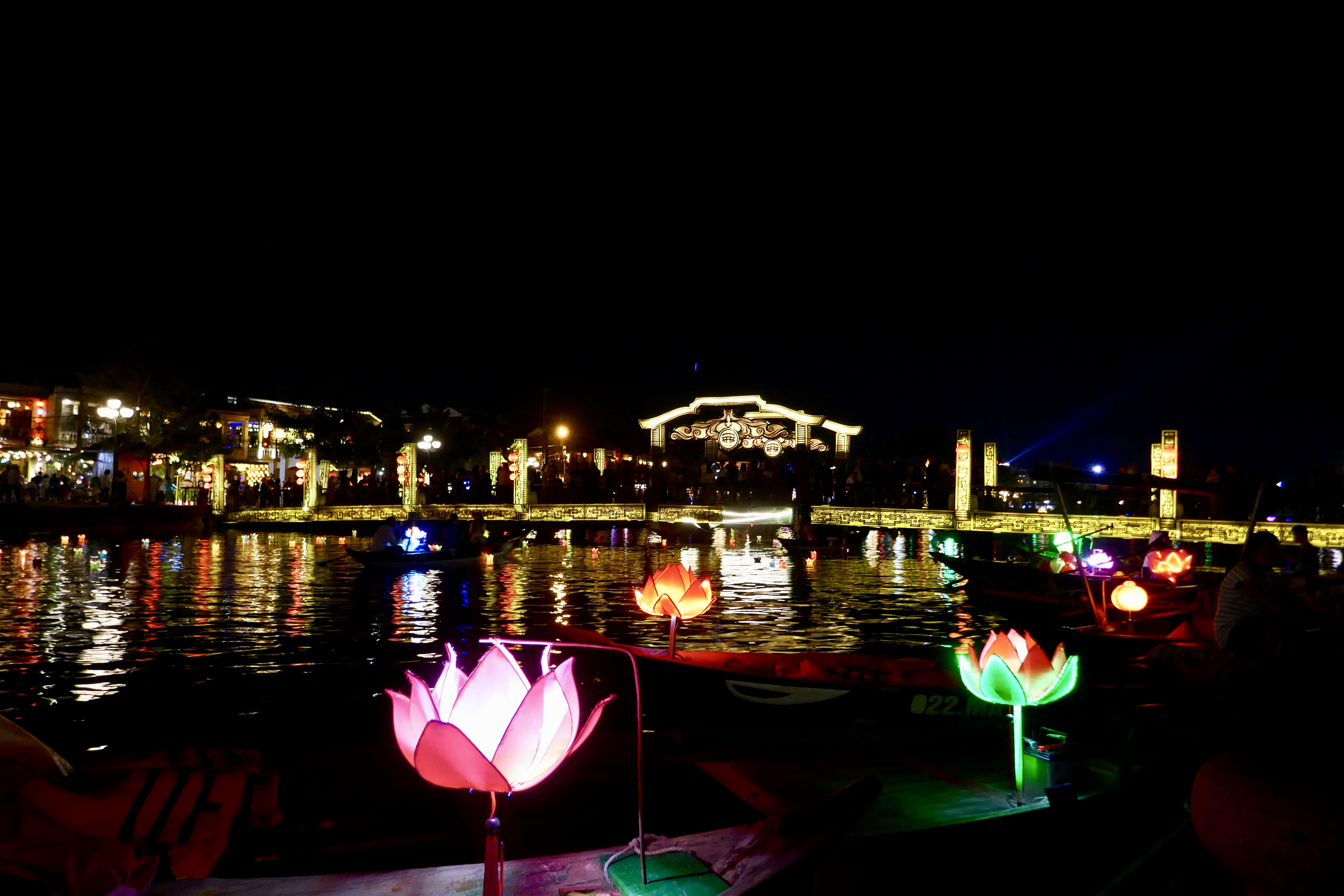
A kind of water lantern popular in Vietnam

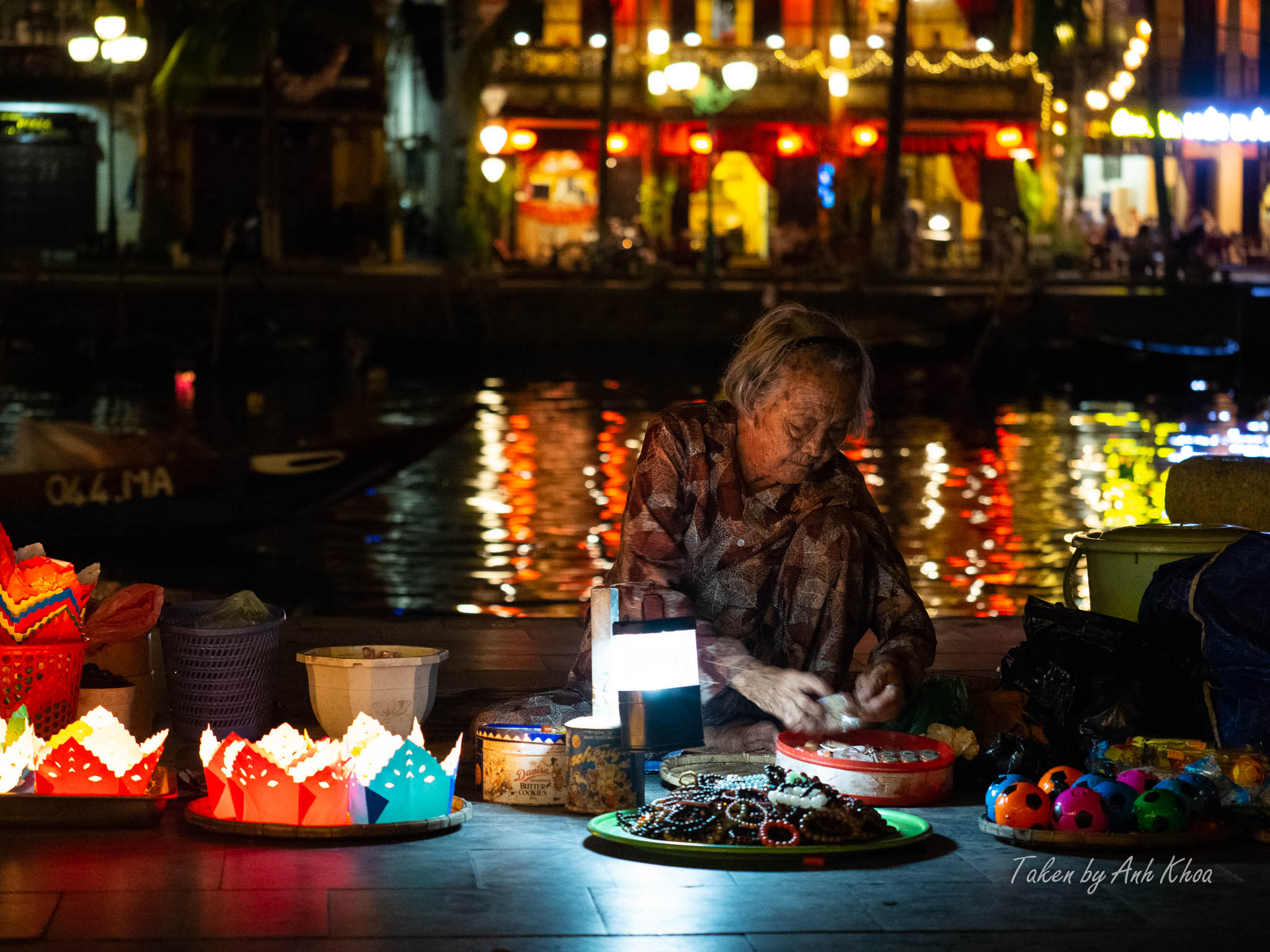
An old lady is selling water lanterns in Hội An

== East Asia ==
=== China ===
Water Lanterns in Hunan Province, China

As early as in the Tang dynasty, the water lantern has been used in traditional Chinese festivals such as the Lantern Festival, Mid-Autumn Festival, Chinese New Year, and even Christmas in some places like Hong Kong. It has many different names, depending on the water body on which the lanterns are released, such as 水燈 (water lantern), 流燈 (floating lantern), 河灯, 江燈 (river lantern), 湖燈 (lake lantern), 水燈頭 (water lamphead), and 照冥 (illumination). The shape of the lanterns may be square or in the form of a lotus flower.

=== Korea ===
In both Koreas, the water lantern is known as 유등 (yudeung: light).

=== Japan ===
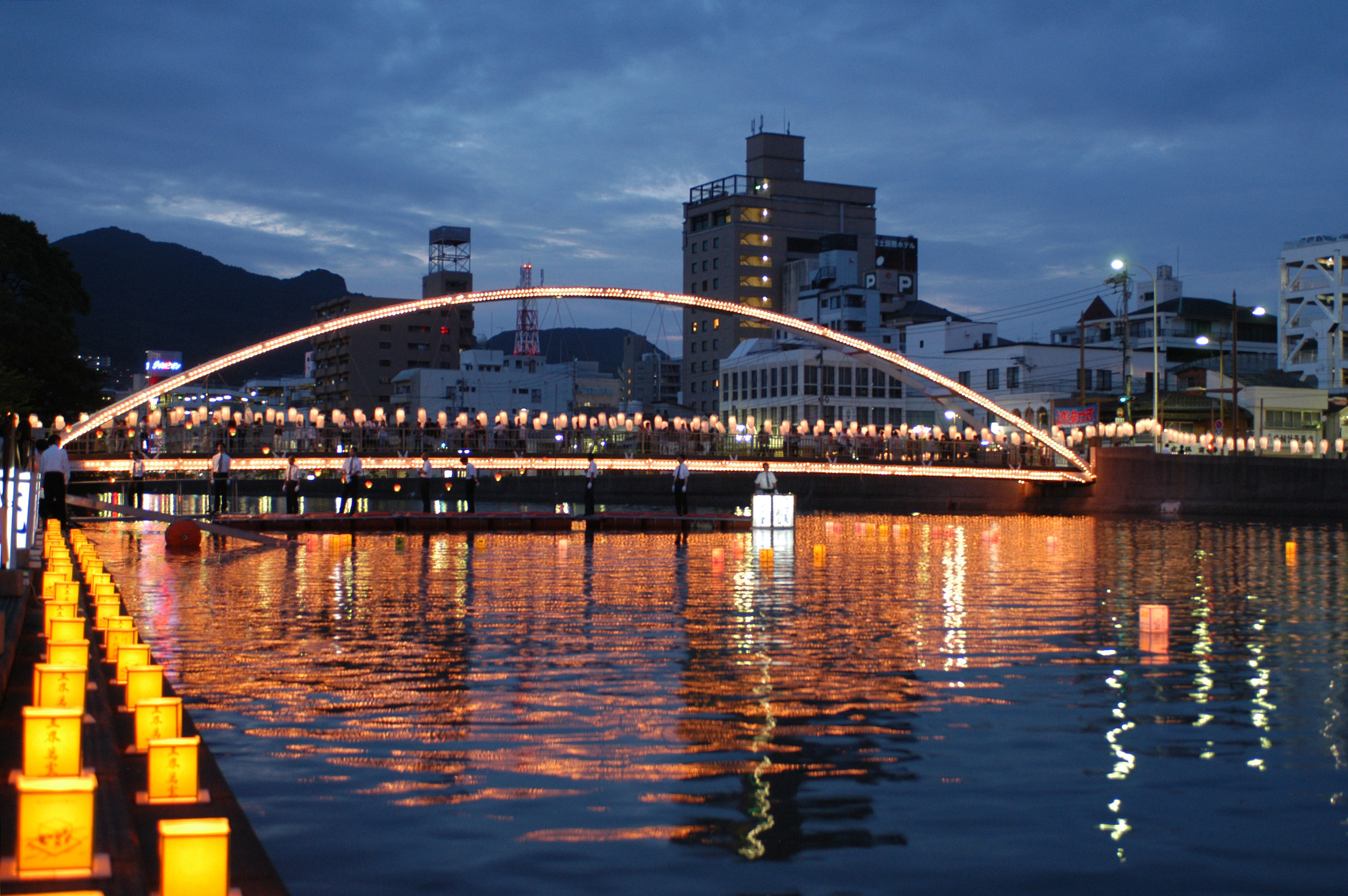
Tōrō nagashi in Sasebo, Japan

Hiroshima Peace Message Lantern Floating Ceremony, August 6, 2019

Tōrō nagashi (灯籠流し or 灯篭流し) is a ceremony in which participants float paper lanterns down a river; tōrō is the Japanese word for "lantern", while nagashi means "cruise" or "flow". This activity is traditionally performed on the final evening of the Bon Festival in the belief that it will help to guide the souls of the departed to the spirit world. The Bon Festival takes place on the thirteenth to sixteenth of August or July, depending on the calendar used. The peaceful custom is a gesture of respect for those who have died and gives participants a moment to think about their ancestors, loved ones or even past pets.

== See also ==
- Diwali Indian light festival
- Loi Krathong Thai lantern festival
- Mid-Autumn Festival
- Spirit Boat Procession
- Tazaungdaing Festival
- Zhong Yuan Festival
