= Rough and Ready Island =

Island in California, USA

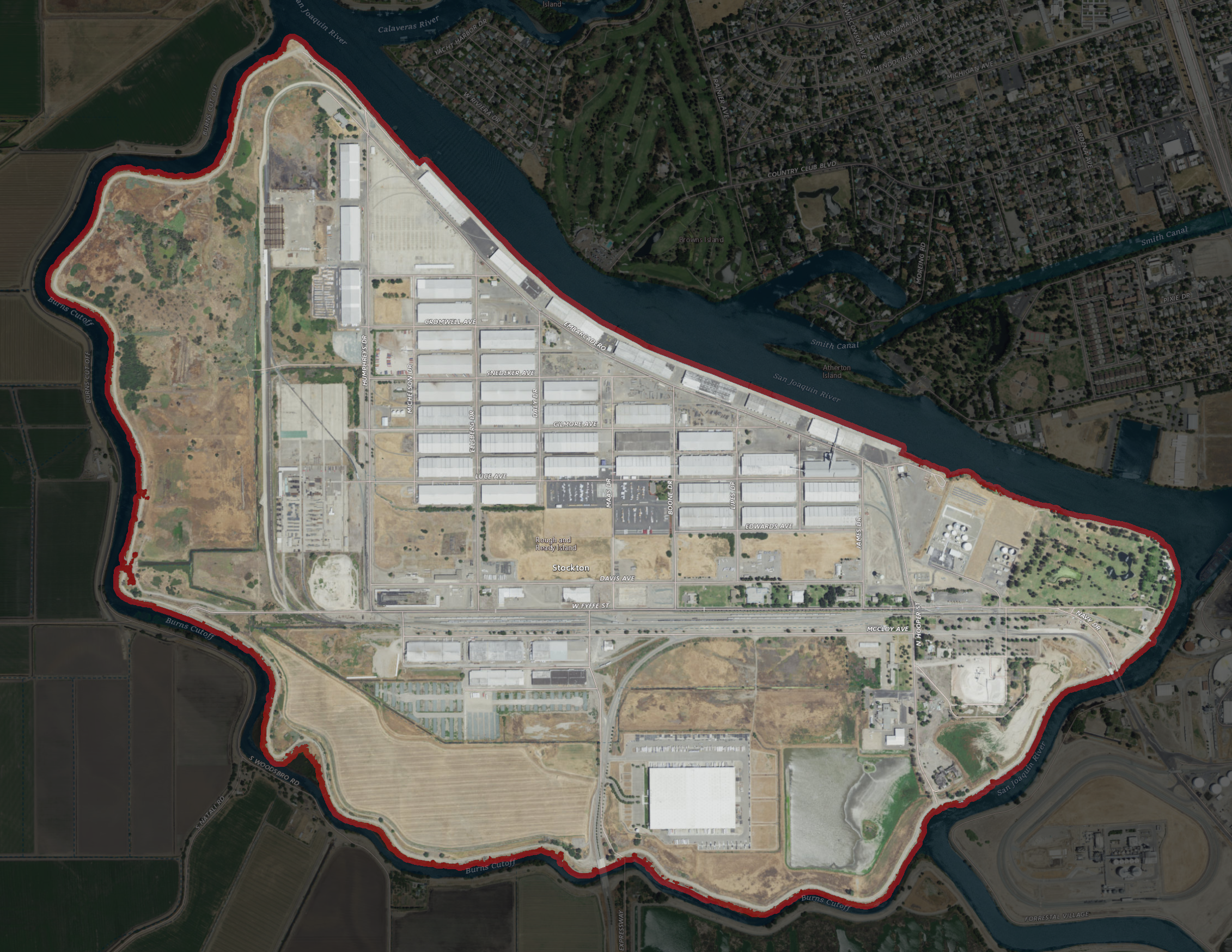
- USGS aerial imagery of Rough and Ready Island

- Location within Sacramento-San Joaquin River Delta Location within California Location within the United States

Geography
- Location: Northern California
- Coordinates: 37°57′03″N 121°21′41″W
- Adjacent to: Sacramento–San Joaquin River Delta
- Highest elevation: 0 ft (0 m)

Administration
- United States
- State: California
- County: San Joaquin

Rough and Ready Island is an island in the San Joaquin River, in the Sacramento–San Joaquin River Delta. It is in San Joaquin County, California, and its coordinates are 37°57′03″N 121°21′41″W. The United States Geological Survey measured its elevation as 0 ft (0 m) in 1981. It appears on 1913 and 2015 USGS map of the area.

The Rough and Ready Island Naval Supply Depot was located on the island. After the base's closure, the island was transferred to the Port of Stockton.
