= Stockton Ordnance Depot =

US WWII military repair facility

- Stockton, California

Site information
- Other areas: Stockton Deep Water Channel (south bank), 424+ acres Rough and Ready Island (southwest end), 131+ acres Roberts Island No. 2, 238+ acres

Location
- Coordinates: 37°56′54.84″N 121°19′33.86″W

The Stockton Ordance Depot was a World War II vehicle repair facility, supply depot, and camp for German and Italian prisoners of war. The installation was also used as a USAF radar station and a DLA Defense Distribution Center.

== Acquisition ==
Construction of the military installation began by September 1941, and the leased areas included L-1 of 42.36 acres (0.06619 sq mi) which had the "Supply Depot" and the subsequent L-2 was for the "Stockton Motor Repair Depot" of 7.63 acres (0.01192 sq mi). Parcels A-2-A, A-2-B, and A-2-C totaling 235.35 acres (0.36773 sq mi) were acquired "from the Estate of Frank Shackleford Boggs on May 11, 1942"; and

== Naval Supply Annex Stockton ==
The Naval Supply Annex Stockton had four warehouses and storage yard built in 1945.

== Radar station ==
The Stockton Bomb Plot was the Stockton Ordnance Depot callsign of the 3903rd Radar Bomb Scoring Group's Detachment I operating the Radar Bomb Scoring station for tracking bombers and evaluating aircrews' performance during simulated Cold War bomb runs for training/proficiency. Detachment I moved to Charlotte, North Carolina in 1950 and later becoming Detachment 4 of the 10th Radar Bomb Scoring Squadron at Houston, Texas c. 1955, and RBS operations for California were subsequently performed by the 11 RBS Squadron's Det 2 at Cheli Air Force Station (Los Angeles Bomb Plot) and Det 4 near McClellan AFB (Sacramento Bomb Plot).

=== Stockton Air Force Station ===
Stockton Air Force Station was a 138.56 acres (0.21650 sq mi) site designated on March 2, 1955, after "portions of Parcels A-2-C and C-1 along with Parcels D-1, and E-1 were transferred to the Department of the Air Force on December 1, 1954." The USAF began the transfer of the site on December 14, 1956; and the property was conveyed after June 1967 payment by the Port of Stockton.

== Defense Distribution Center San Joaquin ==
The Defense Logistics Agency used more than 131 acres (0.205 sq mi) of the site, "including its four warehouses and storage yard built in 1945", "until 1998 when Defense Distribution Center San Joaquin Depot closed its Rough and Ready Island site."

In 2008, "the Port of Stockton [was] attempting to acquire Rough and Ready Island from the Government."

== World War II ==
1,500 German prisoners were held at the depot from May 1944 till June 1946.

== See also ==
- Barbwire Bowl Classic
- San Joaquin Depot
- Sharpe Facility
- Tracy Facility
