= San Joaquin Depot =

Historic site near Stockton, California

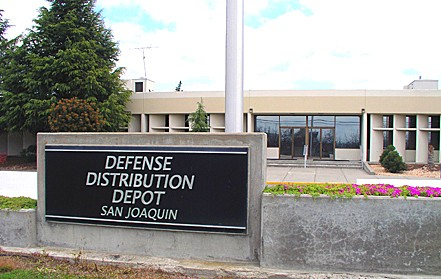
- Defense Distribution Depot San Joaquin (DDJC)

- Location within California
- 37°57′28″N 121°17′27″W
- Location: near Stockton, California.

History
- Built: 1942

Site notes
- Architect: United States Department of Defense

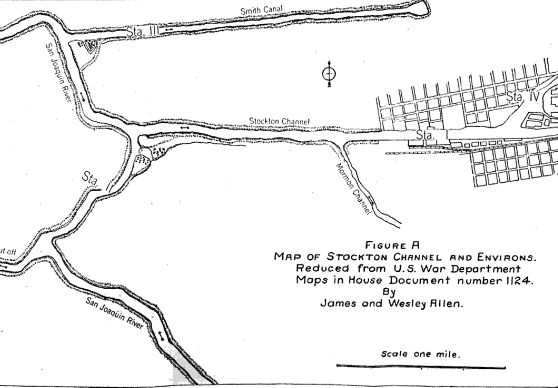
Rough and Ready Island is at the Junction of the San Joaquin River and Stockton Channel

San Joaquin Depot is site of military storage bases. The facilities of San Joaquin Depot: are the Tracy Facility, the Sharpe Facility and former Stockton's Rough & Ready Island depot. The depots are in San Joaquin County, California near Stockton, California. These depots purchased, stored and shipped supplies needed for the World War II efforts in the Pacific War and some supplies to the Western Front. The depots were in an ideal location, at a safe inland port served by the San Joaquin River, which has railroad lines, a network of roads to California bases and nearby airports, including the Stockton Army Airfield. The depots were run the War Department's Defense Logistics Agency. The Defense Logistics Agency ran 22 large depots during World War 2.

In 1942, the 448-acre Tracy Facility opened as a depot of the California Quartermaster depot of Oakland. The depots supported all branches of the United States Armed Forces. In 1950 Tracy Facility was transferred to the Department of Defense's Single Manager Supply System in support of the Korean War, as the depots again became very active. In 1962, Tracy Facility was transferred to the Defense Supply Agency and the Army Supply and Maintenance Command. In 1965 the depots again were very active for the support of the Vietnam War.

The Sharpe Depot Facility is located near the town of Lathrop, California 15 miles from Tracy Depot Facility, located in Tracy, California. In 1999 much of the Sharpe depot transferred to the Tracy Depot. Sharpe depot was reduced to a staff of 100 for support of slow-moving supplies. The town of Tracy started as a railroad stop on September 8, 1878. The rail stop served the agriculture, factories and warehouses at the stop.

In the 1920s the San Joaquin River-Stockton Channel was dredged for ocean ship to come to the Port of Stockton and serve San Joaquin Depots. TheTracy Facility is named after General Henry G. Sharpe who was the US Army Quartermaster General from 1905 to 1918.

- Nearby was the San Joaquin Depot's Rough and Ready Island Naval Supply Depot. The Rough and Ready Island Annex opened in 1944. The depot closed in 1959 and then became the Naval Communications Station for the Pacific Coast region. The Navy built the longest continuous concrete wharf, at 6,500 feet (2,000 m), able berth 13 ships at a time. The Depot Annex served the United States Pacific Fleet from 1994 to 1959. The Depot warehoused naval stores, shipped out surplus Naval property and provided logistical support for other Naval bases. For some time the wharf was used to store as mothballed ships of the reserve fleet for the Pacific Reserve Fleet.
- In 1942, due to the vast demand for supplies, a temporary 724 acres depot at Lathrop, California was built called the Lathrop Holding and Reconsignment and the Lathrop Engineering Depot.

== See also ==
- California during World War II
- Stockton Ordnance Depot
