= Davis Men's Crew Club =

- Location: Curt Rocca Boathouse, Port of Sacramento, California
- Home water: Port of Sacramento
- Founded: 1977
- University: University of California, Davis
- Affiliations: Western Intercollegiate Rowing Association
- Website: ucdmensrowing.org

The Davis Men's Crew Club is a collegiate sports club representing the University of California, Davis in rowing. As a non-funded team, it is a member of the Western Intercollegiate Rowing Association (WIRA), whose participants are mostly of non-Pac-10 schools on the West Coast. Nationwide, the team is one of the most successful collegiate rowing club programs in the United States, making periodic appearances in the Intercollegiate Rowing Association national championships, the Eastern College Athletic Conference and, more recently, the American Collegiate Rowing Association national championships. Notable alumni include Seth Weil (Class of 2011), who rowed in the USA men's coxless four at the 2016 Rio Olympics and who holds two world rowing championship first place titles in the men's four; as well as Carlo Facchino (Class of 1996) who has a place in the Guinness Book of World Records for the fastest Pacific Ocean crossing from Monterey, CA to Honolulu, Hawaii with a time of 39 days, 9 hours and 56 minutes.

== History ==
Founded in 1977, the Davis Men's Crew Club was established under the guidance of Rich Sundquist, a former oarsman from the University of California, Santa Barbara. In 1980, the crew received its first own racing shell, a wooden sweep eight, cut in half and driven from the East Coast on top of a van. In 1993, the crew completed the Curt Rocca Boathouse to replace a smaller boathouse built earlier. The boathouse is still used today, shared with the UC Davis women's rowing team, and located in the Port of Sacramento.

== Organization ==
As a registered university student organization, the team's operations and administrative decisions are managed by its student membership in cooperation with the UC Davis Intramural Sports and Sports Club Office. Council club officers vote on various decisions, from hiring coaches to managing team finances. As a club sport at UC Davis, the program receives minimal funding for a crew team. Most of the club's income comes from membership dues, fundraising, and alumni donations.

Most rowers and coxswains are walk-ons, with little to no previous experience in the sport of rowing. In the Fall, returning crew members recruit students on campus, headed by two elected club recruiters. Those interested can attend practices run by the novice coach, who trains those new to the sport.

Besides the recruiters, many club officers help run the program—those within the council vote on critical issues for the team. Overall, club officers coordinate their responsibilities with one another to ensure all aspects of the program are running smoothly. Officer positions are voted on in an election amongst teammates at the end of each school year.

Club Officer Positions

- Executive Council
  - President
  - Vice-President
  - Secretary
  - Treasurer
  - Fundraiser
- Regular Council Members
  - Haberdasher
  - Historian
  - Recruiters
  - Boathouse Manager
  - Website Manager
  - Safety Representative

== Team tradition ==
Since the club represents UC Davis, the team colors are blue and gold. The official logo insignia of the crew, seen on official racing uniforms and the face of the oar blades, is an Aggie blue UCD written on a white background. The Cal Aggie symbol is often used as well, with oars crossing behind it.

The official mantra of the crew is 'RYBO', an acronym for 'Row your balls off'. To avoid confrontation, members can amend it to a more family-oriented saying, such as 'Row your buns off'. RYBO is found on many official crew apparel and is often included in team cheers, most commonly when a team boat launches for a race.

Racing Shells

- Coxed Eights (8+)
  - Peter Nils Bostrum
  - Hans Strandgaard
  - V1 Vespoli 8
  - E^{3}
  - Crew of '78
  - Sean Thomas McGinity II
  - Morry Lax
  - Marc A. Sawyer
  - NoName Vespoli 8
- Coxed Fours (4+)
  - Haulr
  - NoName Hudson 4
  - The Snyder
  - Accelerator
  - Liberator
- Pair/Doubles (2x/-)
  - NoName Pocock
  - Czerner
  - The Zip

The club offers naming rights to those shells titled 'NoName' for a generous donation.

== Rivalry ==
Regionally, the club's rival is the Sacramento State Hornets. However, the club considers Orange Coast College, Gonzaga, and UC San Diego to be rivals as well, especially since these schools are members of WIRA. In the varsity eight grand final at the 2007 WIRA championship regatta, Davis finished first at 6:03.8, barely ahead of Gonzaga's 6:04.3 and UC San Diego's 6:05.7.

WIRA Events Won, by Year

Varsity Eight	Varsity Four	Junior Varsity 8	Novice Eight	2nd Novice Eight	Novice Four	Light Eight	Light Four
1993 2001 2003 2005 2007	2015	1998 2001 2003 2004 2005 2006	1991 1993 1999 2004	1992 2000 2003	2011	1996 1997 1998 1999 2004	1991

Despite the club's successes in WIRA, every season, the team works toward a long-term goal of becoming more competitive among the top schools in the nation, which are almost always fully funded. Recently, in the 2007 Spring season, Davis's top varsity eight raced against the 3rd level varsity eight of the University of California, Berkeley. This program consistently ranks top 5 in the Intercollegiate Rowing Association's national championships.
