= Rough and Ready Island Naval Supply Depot =

Former US naval installation

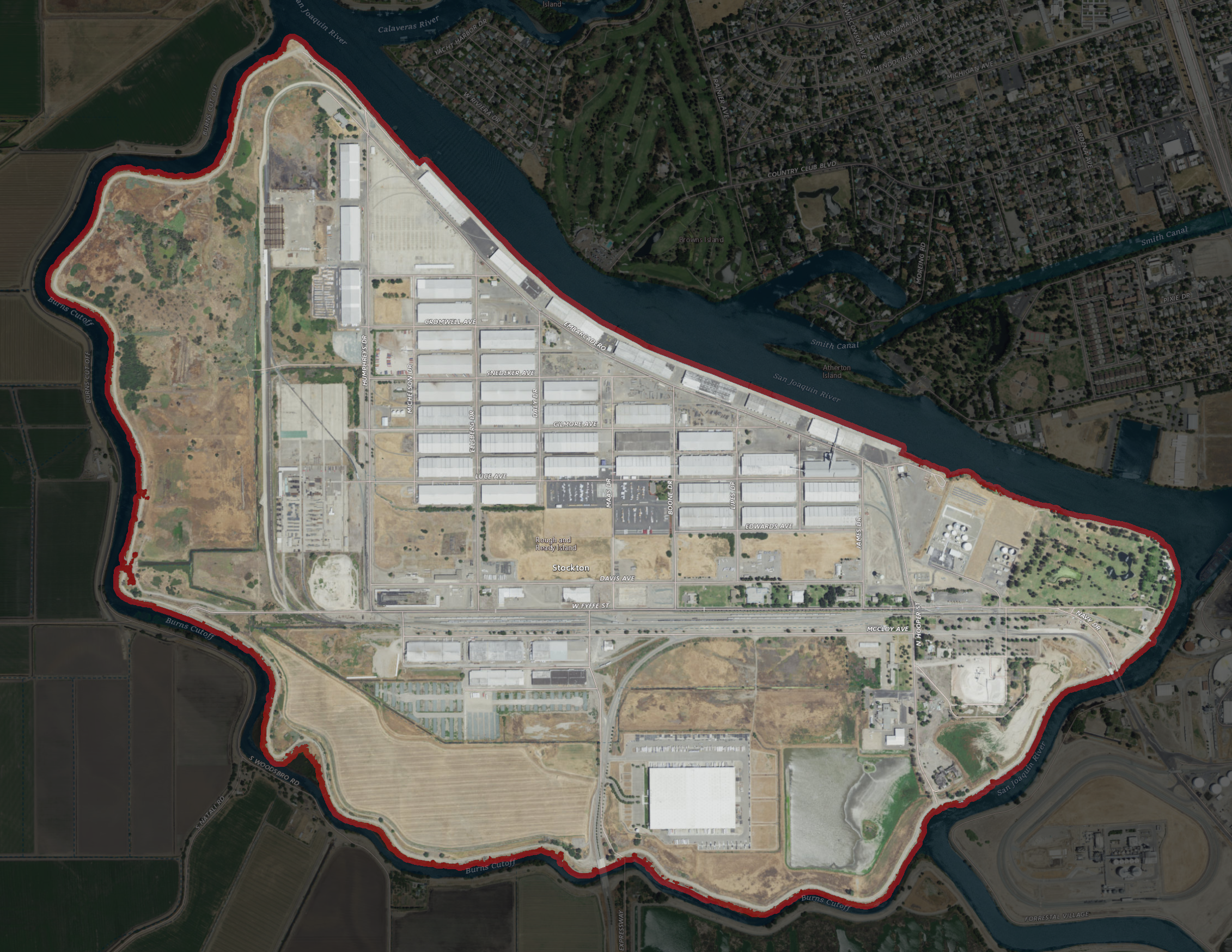
- USGS aerial imagery of Rough and Ready Island

- Location within Sacramento-San Joaquin River Delta Location within California Location within the United States

Geography
- Location: Northern California
- Coordinates: 37°57′03″N 121°21′41″W
- Adjacent to: Sacramento–San Joaquin River Delta
- Highest elevation: 0 ft (0 m)

Administration
- United States
- State: California
- County: San Joaquin

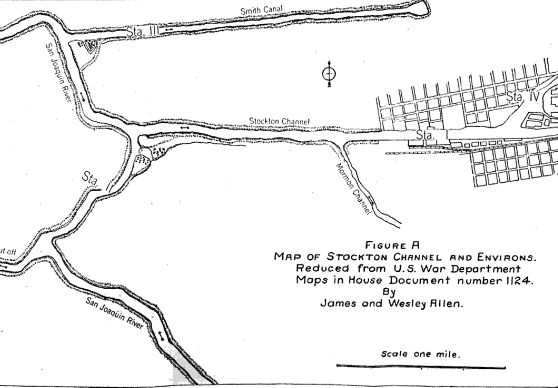
Rough and Ready Island is at the Junction of the San Joaquin River and Stockton Channel

Rough and Ready Island Naval Supply Depot or Ruff and Ready Island is a former United States Navy installation on the San Joaquin River in Stockton, California in San Joaquin County, near the Stockton Channel and was 3 miles (4.8 km) west of Stockton. The Supply Depot was built during World War II as part of the San Joaquin Depot that operated the nearby Tracy Depot Facility and the Sharpe Depot Facility. It was named in honor of President Zachary Taylor.

== Development ==
After World War II began, a new type of naval supply station, the great inland supply depot situated far enough inland to be safe from naval bombardment, was developed. In the spring of 1944, the ability to service the European theater of operations became somewhat stabilized. Increasing emphasis was placed on supplies for the Pacific Theatre of War. West Coast loading facilities at the Naval Supply Depots in San Pedro, Oakland, and Seattle, Washington were already heavily congested which necessitated finding additional facilities for storing and loading supplies.

The planned logistic load included in the plans for the prosecution of the Pacific war would far exceed Oakland's capacity. Transportation and shore-side congestion at the other ports made it necessary to find facilities for loading elsewhere than in the ports themselves. The decision was made to construct a supply annex to NSD Oakland outside the San Francisco Bay area at Stockton. The total work-load of the Oakland and Stockton locations was to include 80 percent of the required fleet supply for the West Coast.

The new depot was the first supply depot to be built entirely according to standard designs developed during the war to meet all requirements of modern materials handling. It was built on Rough and Ready Island, an almost ideal site. It was on a deep-water channel which afforded 32 feet (9.8 m) of water at mean low tide all the way to the Golden Gate, a distance of approximately 70 miles (110 km). It was adjacent to a city with excellent rail and highway connections.

=== Construction authorization ===
The Commandant of the 12th Naval District endorsed the recommendation for use of Stockton, and added suggested that sufficient property be acquired to provide not only for the supply depot, but also for a freight-car classification yard, in-transit reclassification storage, a material redistribution center, and voyage repair facilities. The Chief of the Bureau of Supplies and Accounts, in forwarding the request, requested that the number of storehouses be increased from 20 to 36 to accommodate aviation supply storage urgently needed on the West Coast. Preliminary site survey and soil investigation was authorized June 9, 1944. The 1,500 acres (610 ha) island was flat, and foundation experience on nearby structures indicated new buildings could be erected without pile support. Moreover, the presence of sandy soil assured easy earth moving. Thee highway bridges connected the island with the main land, and the Port of Stockton belt-line railroad, which served the site, connected with three large railroads, the Southern Pacific, the Western Pacific, and the Santa Fe.

On July 26, 1944, the Secretary of the Navy approved the ultimate development of the island in four increments, to a total expenditure of $28,490,000. Field work on the construction of the station began August 25, 1944, with the building of a construction camp, railroad tracks, and 500,000 square feet (46,000 m^{2}) of open storage. Construction of 28 storehouses, 22 of steel frame and 6 of wood frame, began October 21, 1944. By June 30, 1945, the authorized number of storehouses was 38.

=== Standardization employed ===
At Rough and Ready Island Annex, all storehouses were built according to designs standardized for the most economical use of space needs presented by the palletization and fork-lift truck programs of the Bureau of Supplies and Accounts. The pallet was standardized by the Bureau of Supplies and Accounts to consist of wooden, double-bottomed platforms, four feet square. Each pallets was loaded with packaged material to a height of approximately four feet, formed a cube, which, secured by wire, could be easily and quickly moved by a fork-lift truck and cargo from depot to ship to fighting lines without disassembling. The standard pallets were exchanged between installations, those sent overseas being chalked off as expendable. Buildings to meet this need had been constructed at the other depots, but the growth of the depots had been contemporaneous with the growth of the standardization, so that no other depot met the requirements in every building.

In order to make the most economical use of warehouse space, the Bureau of Yards and Docks designed warehouses approximately 200 by 600 feet (61 m × 183 m), with a capacity of 300 carloads of palletized material. These standardized warehouses were first used at Mechanicsburg, Pennsylvania and then at Clearfield, Utah, but it was at Stockton that they were first used throughout the station.

Seven steel-and wood-frame transit sheds, 150 by 600 feet (46 by 183 m) or 150 by 680 ft (46 by 207 m), were built along the riverfront levee, together with 6,300 feet of marginal wharf. Original plans called for nine transit sheds and a 6,000 feet (1,800 m) marginal wharf, but unfavorable soil conditions encountered during construction made the reduction necessary. Two structures, originally intended as transit sheds, were erected as storehouses on locations near the center of the island.

Thirty standard-size steel-frame general storehouses, six wood-frame general storehouses, and two steel-frame heavy materials storehouses completed the wartime development of major buildings at Stockton. Forty-four miles of railroads and 32 miles (51 km) of roads and streets were built.

The site offered 7,800 feet (2,400 m) of water frontage available. The Navy built a continuous concrete wharf, at 6,500 feet (2,000 m), able to berth 13 ships in a line. It also allowed sufficient space to provide for the needs of the sub-depot, and berthing space for a minimum of five ships requiring voyage repairs.

The original plan called for the purchase and development of 824 acres (333 ha), but by the end of the first year, 1,419 acres (574 ha) were included in the station, and the remainder of the island—about 79 acres (32 ha)—was to be turned over to the Navy as soon as two oil companies, already established there, were able to develop facilities elsewhere.

== Operation ==
The Rough and Ready Island Annex opened in 1944 and operated as a supply Depot until 1959 when it became the Naval Communications Station for the Pacific Coast region. The Depot Annex served the United States Pacific Fleet. The Depot warehoused naval stores, disposed of surplus Naval property and provided logistical support for other Naval bases. For some time the wharf was used to store as mothballed ships of the reserve fleet for the Pacific Reserve Fleet.

== Decommissioning ==
The Naval Supply Depot was phased out of use as a result of special legislation sponsored by Senator Dianne Feinstein in 1995. It was transferred to the Port of Stockton between 2000 and 2003. This area of the port is now known as the "West Complex". Located at 37.953°N 121.32°W.

Rough and Ready Island Naval Supply Depot was also known as: Rough and Ready Island; Naval Supply Center, Oakland; Stockton Annex; Stockton Deep Water Slip Channel and Kwajalein Village, California.

== Camp Stockton ==
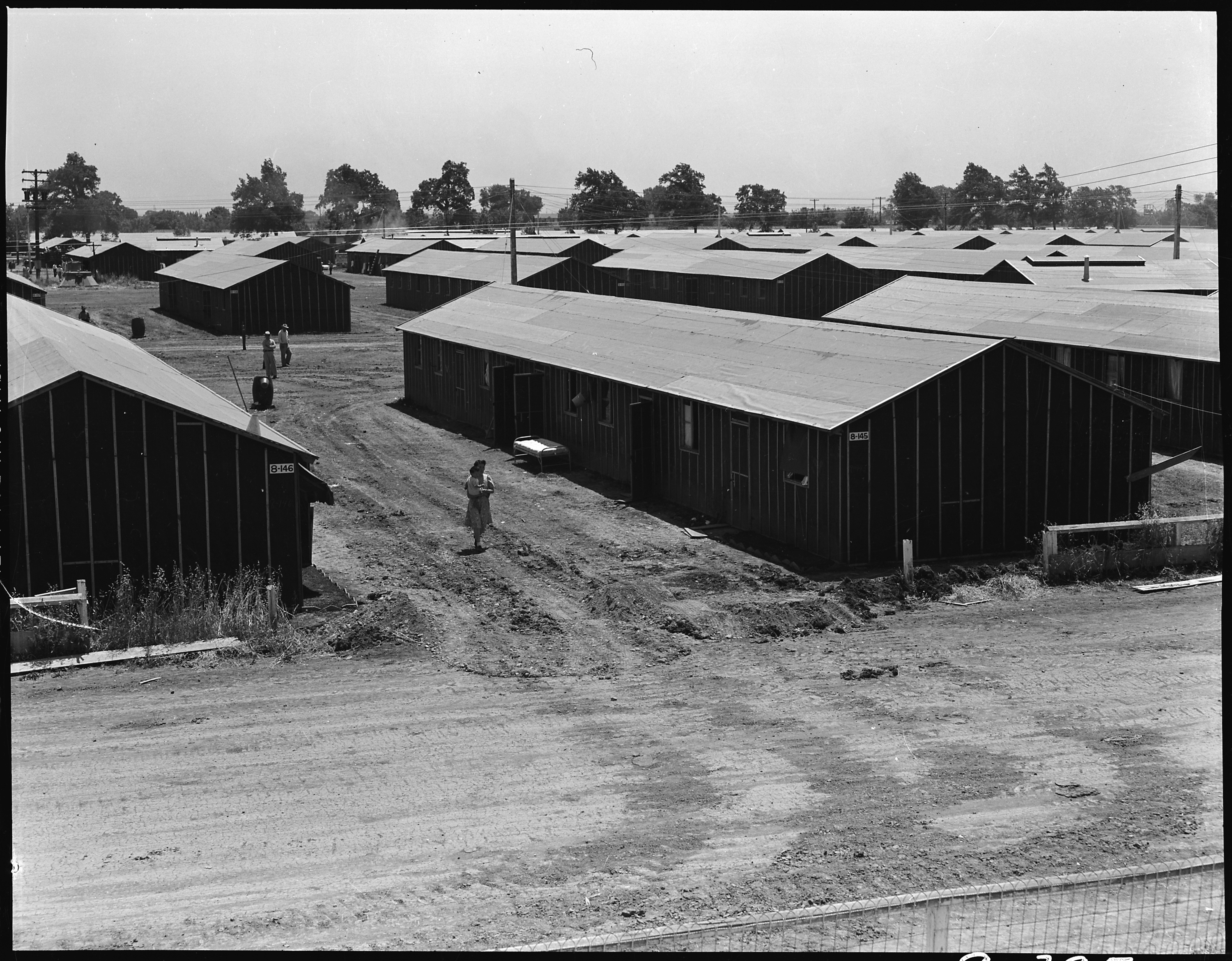
Partial view of the Stockton Assembly Center.

Camp Stockton, a Prisoners of War (POW) camp, was built on the island during the Second World War. The camp opened in April 1944 and closed in June 1946, and held 1551 German POWs. Five German POWs died at the camp and are buried at Benicia Army Cemetery.

"Camp Stockton" is also sometimes used to refer to the Stockton Assembly Center for the temporary detention of Japanese Americans, located at the San Joaquin County Fairgrounds. When the Japanese Americans were moved to permanent camps, the facility became a POW camp. The Stockton detention facility held 889 prisoners.

== Pacific Reserve Fleet, Stockton ==
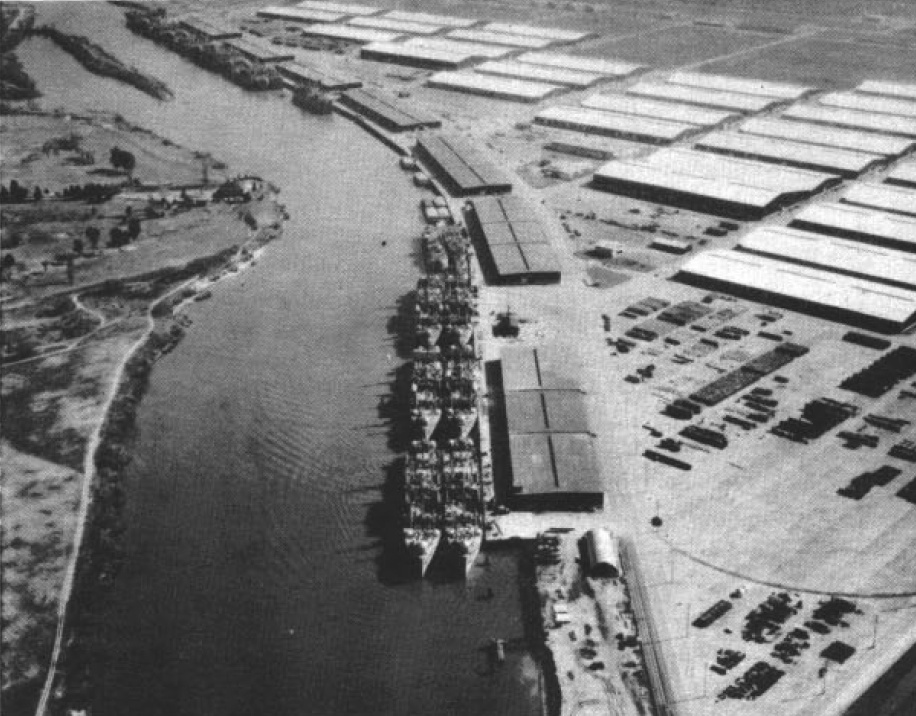
Pacific Reserve Fleet, Stockton in 1948. By the end of the Korean War the fleet ran from one end of the warf to the other (6500') and most of the rafts were three ships deep

Pacific Reserve Fleet, Stockton also called Pacific Reserve Fleet, Stockton Group was a United States Navy reserve fleets in the San Joaquin River at Stockton, California. The mothball fleet of World War II ships was next to the Naval Reserve Center on Rough and Ready Island. The freshwater of the river made a good spot to store ships. Some ships there were reactivated for Korean War and Vietnam War.

== See also ==
- San Joaquin Depot
  - Tracy Facility
  - Sharpe Facility
- American Theater (1939–1945)
- Desert Training Center
- Military history of the United States during World War II
- United States home front during World War II
