= Sacramento–San Joaquin River Delta =

Inland river delta and estuary in Northern California

Coordinates: 38.067975°N 121.8427354°W

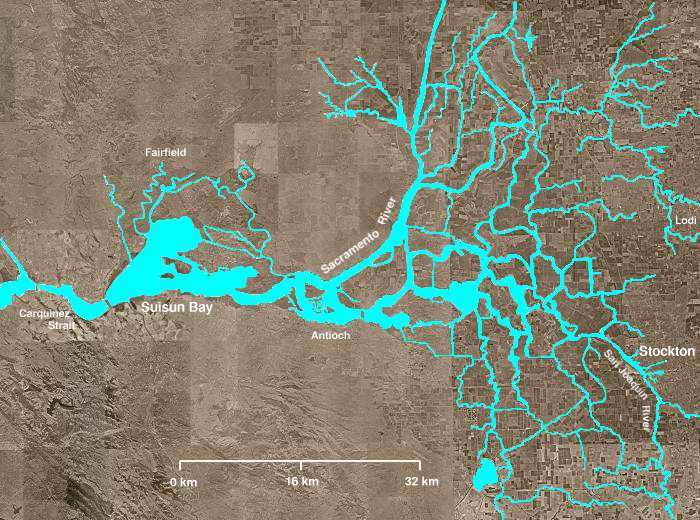
Northern California's Sacramento–San Joaquin River Delta. The Sacramento River flows into the delta from the north and the San Joaquin River from the south through Stockton.

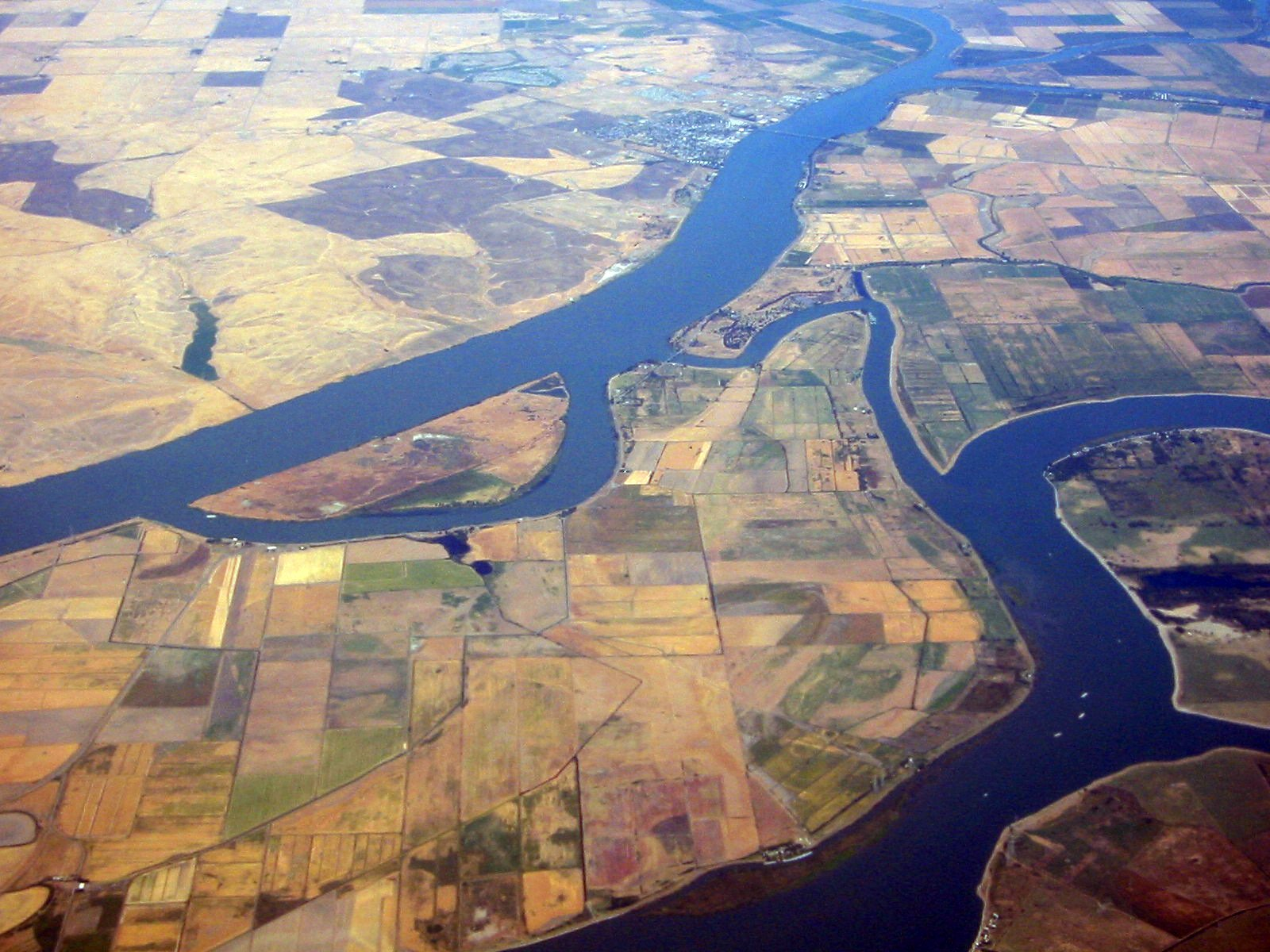
Part of the Delta viewed from above. Sherman Island in foreground with the Sacramento River above and San Joaquin River below/right.

The Sacramento–San Joaquin River Delta, or California Delta, is an expansive inland river delta and estuary in Central California and Northern California. The delta is formed at the western edge of the Central Valley by the confluence of the Sacramento and San Joaquin rivers and lies just east of where the rivers enter Suisun Bay, which flows into San Francisco Bay, then the Pacific Ocean via San Pablo Bay. The Delta is recognized for protection by the California Bays and Estuaries Policy. Sacramento–San Joaquin Delta was designated a National Heritage Area on March 12, 2019. The city of Stockton is located on the San Joaquin River at the eastern edge of the delta. The total area of the Delta, including both land and water, is about 1,100 square miles (2,800 km^{2}). Its population is around 500,000.

The Delta was formed by rising sea level following glaciation, leading to the accumulation of Sacramento and San Joaquin River sediments behind the Carquinez Strait, the sole outlet from the Central Valley to San Pablo Bay. The narrowness of the Carquinez Strait coupled with tidal action has caused the sediment to pile up, forming expansive islands. Geologically, the Delta has existed for about 10,000 years, since the end of the Last Glacial Period. In its natural state, the Delta was a large freshwater marsh, consisting of many shallow channels and sloughs surrounding low islands of peat and tule.

Since the mid-19th century, most of the region has been gradually claimed for agriculture. Wind erosion and oxidation have led to widespread subsidence on the Central Delta islands; much of the Delta region today sits below sea level, behind levees earning it the nickname "California's Holland". Much of the water supply for Central California and Southern California is also derived from the Delta, via pumps located at the southern end of the Delta. The pumps deliver water for irrigation in the San Joaquin Valley and municipal water supply for Southern California.

== Geography ==
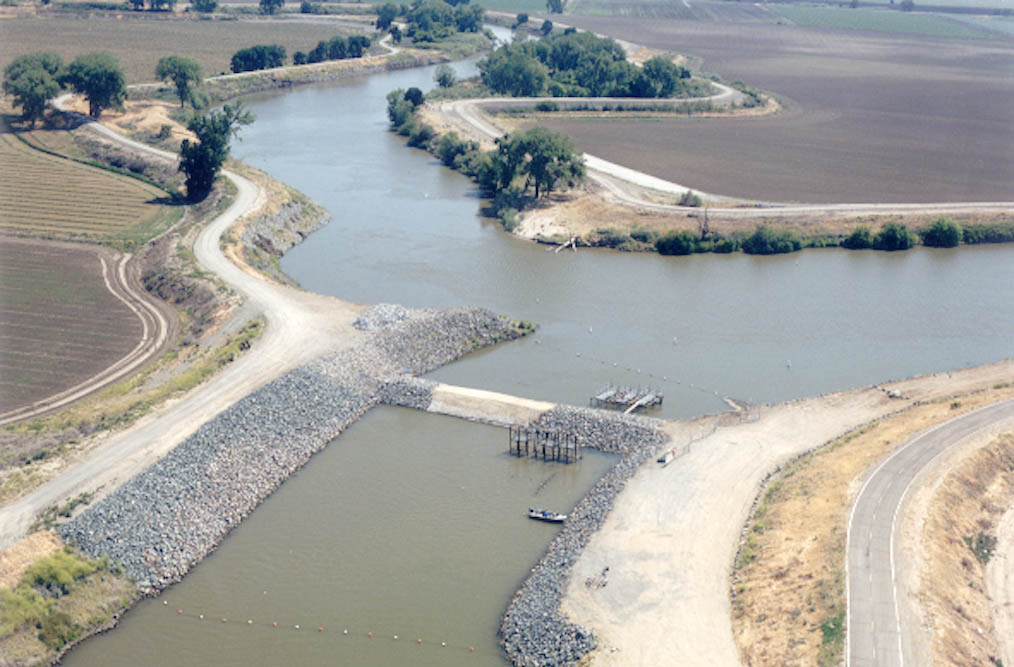
The Old River, a former channel of the San Joaquin River located in the southwestern Delta

The Delta consists of approximately 57 reclaimed islands and tracts but there are nearly 200 islands in the delta that are named or not named. These are all surrounded by 1,100 miles (1,800 km) of levees that border 700 miles (1,100 km) of waterways. The southwestern side of the Delta lies at the foothills of the California Coast Ranges, while to the northwest sit the lower Montezuma Hills. Most of the Delta lies within Contra Costa, Sacramento, San Joaquin, Solano and Yolo Counties. The total human population of the Delta was 515,264 as of 2000.

Altogether, the Delta covers 1,153 square miles (2,990 km^{2}), with 841 mi^{2} (2,180 km^{2}), or nearly 73 percent, devoted to agriculture. About 100 mi^{2} (260 km^{2}) of the Delta area is urban and 117 mi^{2} (300 km^{2}) are undeveloped land. The rivers, streams, sloughs and waterways of the Delta total about 95 mi^{2} (250 km^{2}) of surface, although this fluctuates greatly with seasons and tides. Geologically, it is not considered a true river delta, but rather an inverted river delta, as it formed inward (sediments accumulating progressively inland) rather than outward. The only other major river delta in the world located this far inland is the Pearl River Delta in China.

The main source rivers include the Sacramento River from the north, the San Joaquin from the southeast, and the Calaveras and Mokelumne Rivers from the east. The Calaveras and Mokelumne are both tributaries of the San Joaquin River. The Sacramento and San Joaquin Rivers join at the western end of the Delta near Pittsburg, at the head of Suisun Bay, although they are linked upstream by the Georgiana Slough, which was first used by steamboats in the 19th century as a shortcut between Sacramento and Stockton. The southwestern part of the Delta is also transected by the Middle River and Old River, former channels of the San Joaquin. These rivers transport more than 30 million acre-feet (8.9 mi^{3}; 37 km^{3}) of water through the Delta each year – about 50 percent of all California's runoff.

Nearby cities include Lodi and Stockton to the east, Tracy and Manteca to the south, Brentwood to the southwest, and Pittsburg and Antioch to the west. The state capital, Sacramento, is located just to the north of the Delta.

The Sacramento River Deep Water Ship Channel connects the Delta to the Port of Sacramento, with its terminus located near Rio Vista, on the northwestern side of the Delta. The Stockton Ship Channel is a dredged and partially straightened section of the San Joaquin River cutting directly through the Delta from the Port of Stockton to the San Joaquin's confluence with the Sacramento near Antioch.

== Geology, formation and natural conditions ==
"The virgin California Delta was so vast, wild and confusing – its sloughs meandered everywhere and led nowhere – that John C. Frémont lost a whole regiment in there for several days, and some who ventured in just disappeared."

— Marc Reisner, A Dangerous Place (2003)

The Delta was formerly located at the bottom of a large inland sea in the Central Valley, which formed as the uplift of the California Coast Ranges blocked off drainage from the Sierra Nevada to the Pacific. About 560,000 years ago, water breached the mountains, carving out the present-day Carquinez Strait and San Francisco Bay. The drainage of all the water through this narrow gap formed a bottleneck in the Central Valley's outflow; this constriction is essential to provoke the slowing of river current and the resulting sediment deposits that now make up the Delta.

The Delta in its contemporary (pre-1850s) state began to form about 10,000 years ago at the end of the last Ice Age. During the Ice Age global sea levels were about 300 ft (91 m) lower than today, and the Delta region, as well as Suisun Bay, the Carquinez Strait and San Francisco Bay, were a river valley through which the continuation of the Sacramento and San Joaquin Rivers flowed to the Pacific Ocean. When sea levels rose again, ocean water backed up through the Carquinez Strait into the Central Valley; the combination of the narrow strait and tidal action pushing inland dramatically slowed the current of these rivers and forced them to drop sediment. The early delta was composed of shifting channels, sand dunes, alluvial fans and floodplains that underwent constant fluctuation because of rapidly rising seas – one inch (25 mm) per year. About 8,000 years ago, the rate of sea-level rise slackened, allowing wetland plants to take hold in the Delta, trapping sediment; the growth and decay of these plants began to form the vast peat deposits that make up the Delta islands. The Delta reached a stabilized form similar to its mid-1800s state about 2,000–3,000 years ago.

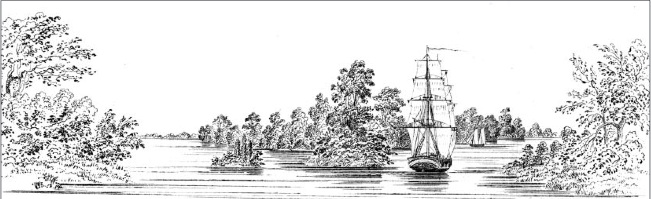
An 1850 drawing of the Sacramento River in the Delta, showing the lush foliage that made up much of the virgin Delta.

Immediately before large-scale human development, most of the Delta islands had saucer-like cross sections, with low natural levees flanking a marshy interior "bowl" that flooded intermittently with the seasons and tides. The height of these natural levees, formed from overbank deposits of sediments deposited by annual river floods, ranged from one foot (0.30 m) above mean high tide at Sherman Island on the Sacramento River, to seven to eight feet (2.1 to 2.4 m) at Andrus, Staten and Tyler Islands, located further east near the Mokelumne River. An estimated 60 percent of the Delta flooded for up to two hours each day at high tide; during spring tides or river floods, it was not uncommon for the entire Delta to be under water.

== History ==
Humans have inhabited the Delta for up to 4,300 years. The estimated indigenous population of the Delta at the time of first contact with Europeans was about 3,000–15,000, predominantly Miwok and Maidu, with some estimates ranging up to 20,000. The Native Americans lived in villages of 200–1,000 people on the eastern edge of the Delta, where the land was higher and less susceptible to flooding. Their lives centered around the abundant reeds or tules that grew on the Delta islands, which they used to make houses, boats, and garments. Staple foods included tule roots and pollen, acorns, wild fruits and seeds, fish and game.

Europeans first entered the Delta region in 1772, when Spanish explorer Don Pedro Fages and missionary Juan Crespí observed the Delta from the summit of nearby Mount Diablo. For decades, the Delta was little utilized by the Spanish colonists. Expeditions from 1806 to 1812 failed to locate suitable mission sites in the Delta area. However, frequent military expeditions were made into the Delta from 1813 to 1845 in response to animosities between the Native Americans and the Spanish and later Mexicans; also several land grants were made in the vicinity of the Delta, including one to John Augustus Sutter, who started the first significant European settlement in the Central Valley just north of the Delta near present-day Sacramento.

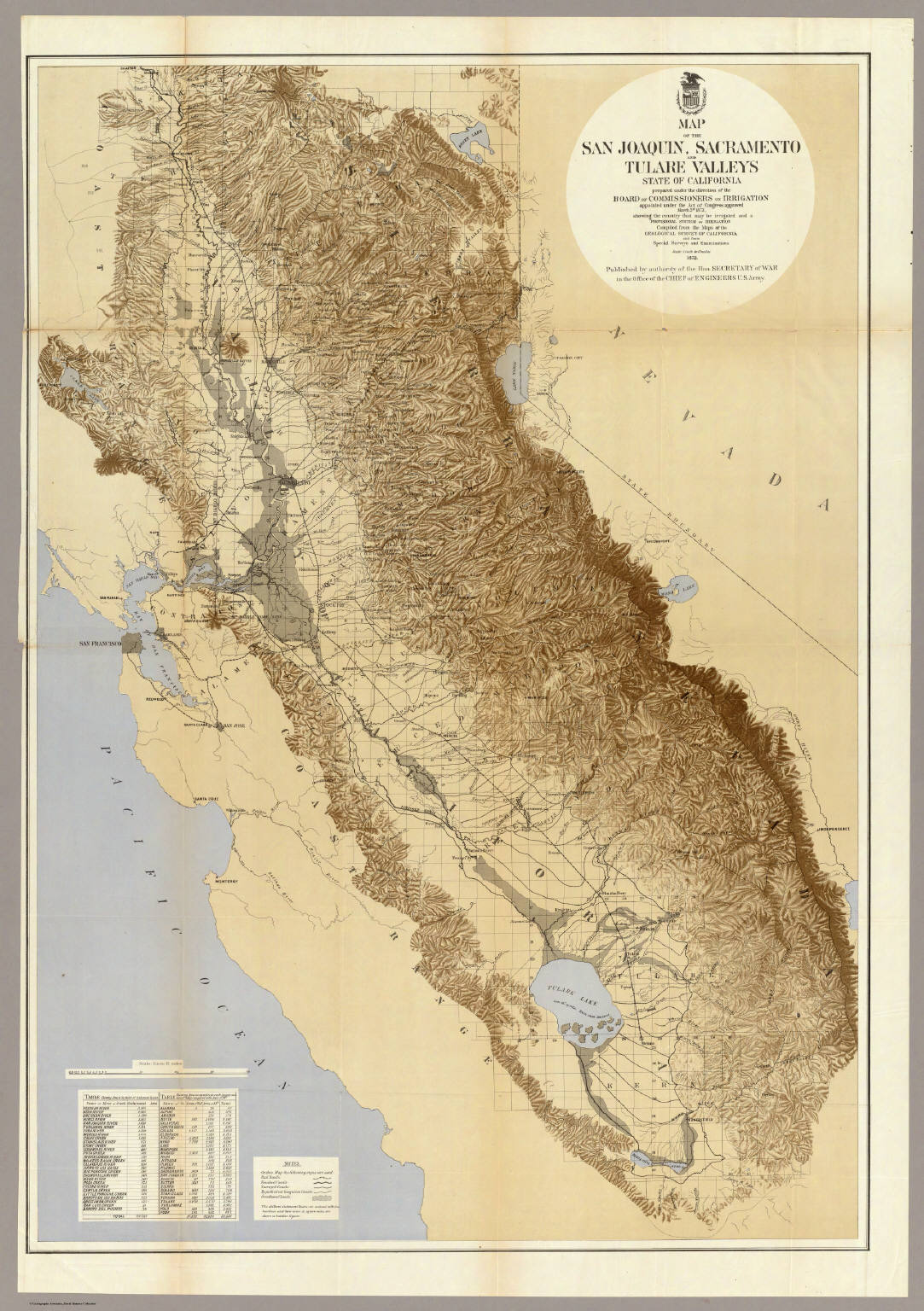
An 1873 map showing the river systems of the Central Valley, with wetlands marked in gray. The Delta, at roughly left center, was the largest area of contiguous, perennial wetlands in pre-development California.

The Spanish conscripted large numbers of Native Americans for labor on missions; many Native Americans fled deep into the Delta in order to escape their European masters. However, this did not protect them from diseases. A malaria epidemic in 1833 decimated local native populations; this was probably exacerbated by the marshy geography of the area, which bred large amounts of mosquitoes.

The agricultural value of the Delta was first recognized during the California Gold Rush, when farmers planted orchards on Delta islands to provide fresh fruit for mining camps in the Sierra Nevada. Because of the flat terrain coupled with year-round availability of fresh water, irrigation here was cheaper and simpler than other fertile regions of California. As a result, the Delta remained California's richest farming region (alongside Los Angeles County) until the 1940s, when massive federal water projects finally made possible the full-scale irrigation of the main body of the Central Valley. Today, the Delta is still among the state's most productive farming regions.

In 1850, Congress passed the Arkansas or Swampland Act, which allowed for the transfer of title for wetlands to private owners on the conditions that the land would be reclaimed. In California, more than two million acres (3,100 sq mi; 8,100 km^{2}) of wetlands were partitioned under the Swampland Act, of which 500,000 acres (780 sq mi; 2,000 km^{2}) were in the Sacramento–San Joaquin Delta, roughly the same amount of land that has been developed to date. Agricultural interests in the Delta were protected by the building of levees, a colossal effort first undertaken by Chinese laborers from the 1850s to the 1870s. The Board of Reclamation, formed in 1861, collectivized levee construction in the Delta by grouping islands into areas known as reclamation districts. The early levees were built of peat, and were highly susceptible to wind and water erosion. The Great Flood of 1862 obliterated much of the existing Delta infrastructure, forcing landowners to rebuild their levees higher and stronger; more flooding in 1878 and 1881 reinforced these notions.

Although land holdings in the Delta were initially limited to 320 acres (0.50 sq mi; 1.3 km^{2}) per buyer, this limit was repealed in 1868, allowing large agricultural conglomerates to take entire islands and carry out massive reclamation projects. From 1868 to 1869, the entirety of Sherman Island, some 14,000 acres (22 sq mi; 57 km^{2}), was diked and drained by a system of levees, flumes and floodgates. By the 1890s, the original levee system had been largely replaced with stronger embankments consisting of clay dredged from nearby river bottoms. By 1900, about 235,000 acres (367 sq mi; 950 km^{2}), or nearly half of the Delta's land area, had been reclaimed. Most of the farmable land in the Delta had been reclaimed by the 1920s.

== Economy and human use ==
=== Agriculture ===
The Delta produces crops valued at about $650 million annually (for the 1998–2004 period), making it one of the most productive farming regions of the United States in terms of crop value per unit area. Agriculture provides secondary benefits of over $2 billion to the local economy. Major crops grown in the Delta include corn, grain, hay, sugar beets, alfalfa, tomatoes, asparagus, and safflower; various fruits are also raised here, as well as some livestock. Crops in the Delta cannot be irrigated using conventional methods due to the highly absorbent quality of the peat soil and irregularities caused by land subsidence. Irrigation is typically carried out periodically by piping water into small "spud ditches", which spread water over large areas and raise the local water table. The heightened groundwater is then gradually depleted by the crop until irrigation is required again.

=== Transportation ===
Delta waterways are also major transportation corridors for agricultural products; the ports of Sacramento and Stockton, located on the Sacramento and San Joaquin rivers, respectively, are the most important inland ports in California. The San Joaquin River throughout most of the Delta and the lower Sacramento River below its connection to the Sacramento Deep Water Ship Channel are routinely dredged to allow the passage of large cargo ships. The Sacramento River corridor has been maintained to a depth of 7 ft (2.1 m) as early as 1899, and was deepened to 30 ft (9.1 m) in 1955. The Stockton Ship Channel has been dredged since 1913; however, its present depth of 37 ft (11 m) was only achieved in 1987. The Delta is also home to the port of Benicia, an automobile and bulk shipping facility. Petroleum is shipped to both the Benicia Refinery and the Martinez Refinery by water. Nearby is the Port Chicago Marine Ocean Terminal, a facility that supports the U.S. Navy.

=== Water supply ===
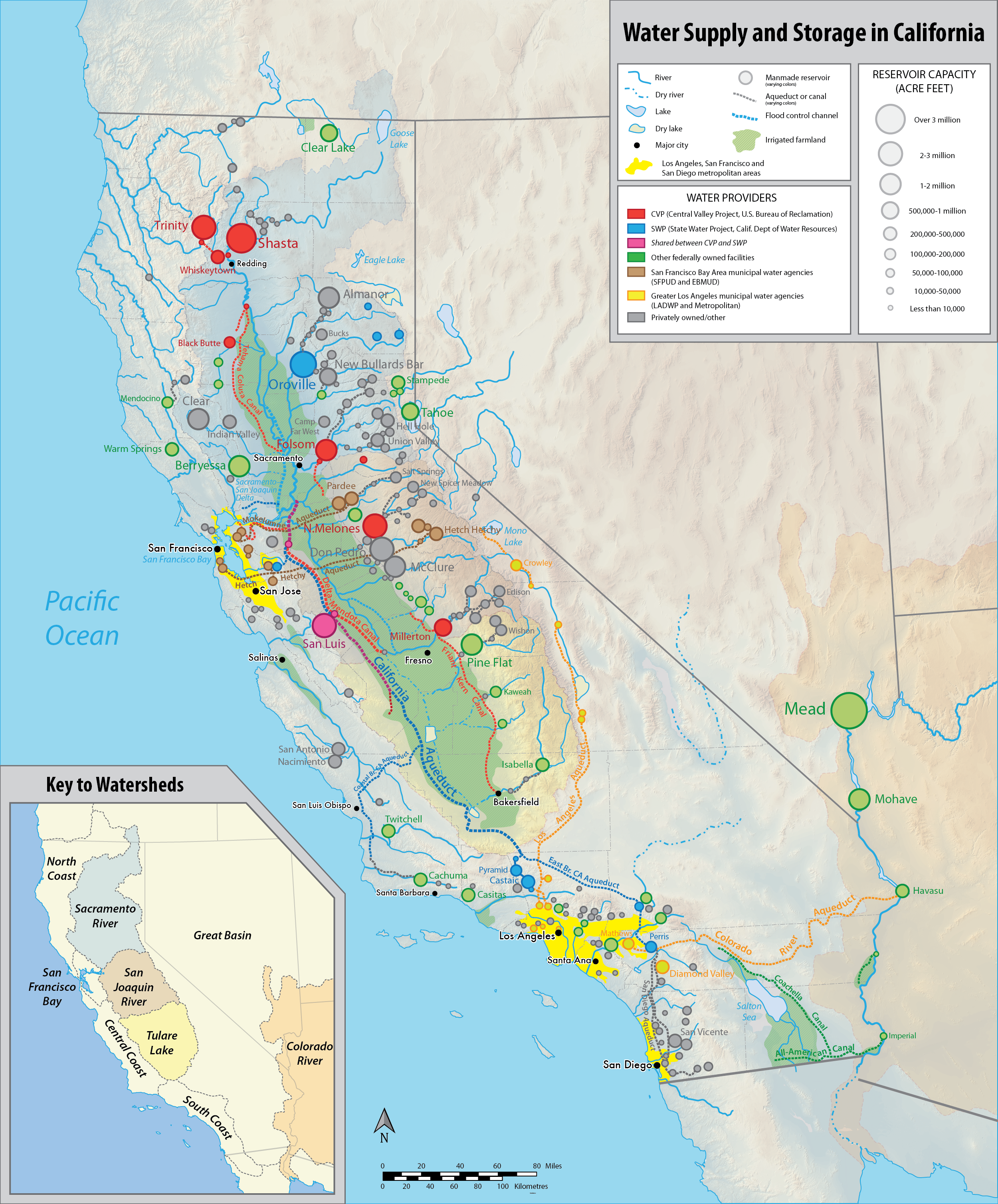
The Delta (located south of Sacramento, middle left, at the confluence of the Sacramento and San Joaquin rivers) is central to California's water supply system.

The Delta is often considered the nexus of California's statewide water system. About half the total river flow in the state passes through this region, from which water is exported to other areas of the San Joaquin Valley, Southern California and portions of the Bay area to supply some 1,130,000 acres (1,770 sq mi; 4,600 km^{2}) of farmland and 23 million people in central and Southern California. The Delta provides an estimated seven million acre-feet (2.1 cu mi; 8.6 km^{3}) of water per year, of which about 100,000 acre-feet (0.030 cu mi; 0.12 km^{3}) are exported to the San Francisco Bay Area, 1.7 million acre-feet (0.50 cu mi; 2.1 km^{3}) are used locally, and over five million acre-feet (1.5 mi^{3}; 6.2 km^{3}) are exported to the San Joaquin Valley, coastal Central and Southern California.

Intrusion of brackish water into the Delta is a recurring natural phenomenon; however, it became a serious issue after the development of agriculture in the upper Sacramento and San Joaquin valley reduced inflows. Multiple droughts between 1910 and 1940 caused significant salinity intrusion in the Delta because of the reduction of freshwater inflows. The growing Delta water quality issue provided the initial impetus for building dams on Central Valley rivers to boost dry-season freshwater flows. This eventually became the federal Central Valley Project (CVP), California's first major statewide water system, most of which was built between the 1930s and the 1960s.

Today, the California Aqueduct and the Delta-Mendota Canal, two of the state's largest water conveyance facilities, both draw water from the southern end of the Delta at the Clifton Court Forebay. Built in the mid-twentieth century, the former supplies water to the Los Angeles Basin and coastal central California via the State Water Project; the latter, a part of the CVP, provides supplies of irrigation water in the fertile San Joaquin Valley. Although the vast majority of water supplied by these projects is used for agriculture and urban areas, some water is also provided for wildlife refuges and habitat conservation works. The Contra Costa Canal and North Bay Aqueduct also take Delta water, supplying the nearby San Francisco Bay Area. Locally, the Delta provides water for cities and towns in five counties and for over 1,800 agricultural users.

=== Recreation ===
The Delta is also a popular site for recreation and is used for sailing, waterskiing, houseboating, fishing, and hunting. The Delta is home to over 100 marinas and 25 yacht clubs. In 2010, over seven million 'annual visitor boating days' occurred on the Delta, according to a local government survey.

The Delta is home to several state and regional parks, reflecting a variety of recreational activities. These include historical interpretative centers, including Delta Meadows and Locke Boarding House and the Old Sacramento State Historic Park. The Port Chicago Naval Magazine National Memorial offers visitors a chance to learn about the disaster that represented the largest domestic loss of life in the U.S. in World War II, and the impact it had on race relations in the U.S. military.

Brannan Island State Recreation Area offers boat launches and facilities that support fishing, windsurfing, waterskiing, and sailing, in addition to campsites, picnic areas and trails to allow visitors to explore the marshes and islands of the area.

Originally a Delta farming island, Franks Tract flooded in 1936 and again in 1938. The levees were never repaired and the island remained submerged, becoming an expanse of open water dotted with remnants of the original levees now the only landforms. In 1959, the area became a state park. Franks Tract State Recreation Area is accessible only by water and is used for fishing, waterfowl hunting, and boating.

The Pacific Flyway, a north–south route for migratory birds, crosses the Delta. The migratory birds provide both birdwatching and hunting opportunities. Including the northern Suisun Marsh, there are over 150 private duck clubs in the area.

== Effects of the levee system and freshwater diversion ==
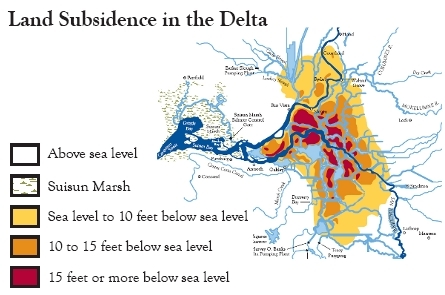
Land subsidence in the Delta as of 1995

The levee system allowed farmers to drain and reclaim almost 500,000 acres (780 sq mi; 2,000 km^{2}) of the Delta, then a tidal marsh. Once the rivers were confined to their riverbeds, the peat soil of the former tidal marsh was exposed to oxygen. As the oxygen-rich peat soil decomposed and then released carbon dioxide, profound subsidence of the land resulted, of up to 25 feet since the late 1800s.

Currently, most of the Delta is below sea level, with a great deal of the western and central Delta at least 15 feet (4.6 m) below sea level. The California Department of Water Resources has experimented with re-flooding areas for wetland restoration, in order to sequester carbon and rebuild soil levels. In addition, shallow flooding of land to restore anaerobic conditions is used as a sedimentation enhancing strategy to reduce subsidence and restore the wetlands in the Delta.

Land subsidence has endangered the Delta's system of protective levees, occasionally triggering levee failure and subsequent flooding.

Using the Delta as the primary valve in a linear water system may have been convenient for a period, but that convenience has come at a high price for the environment.

— Paul Shigley, The Devil Is in the Delta (2012)

Land subsidence also allows brackish water intrusion into the Delta, an issue compounded by the diversion of up to 25% of the freshwater flowing into the Delta. The decreased volume of freshwater in the Delta has had a profound effect on its ecology. In most years, large dams in the Delta watershed fully hold back spring runoff; as a result the Delta is most susceptible to salinity intrusion between February and June. However, regulation provided by dams helps boost freshwater flows during dry summers and autumns, reducing the risk of salinity intrusion in these months.

Diversions located at the southern end of the Delta, however, have negated some of the benefits of upstream dams. The powerful pumps that supply water for the Central Valley Project and State Water Project cause water in the Delta to flow from north to south instead of the natural direction of east to west. This has caused multiple environmental issues, such as the disruption of fish migration and salinity buildup in the eastern Delta, where salts can no longer be flushed to the sea by natural river flows.

== Levee failures ==
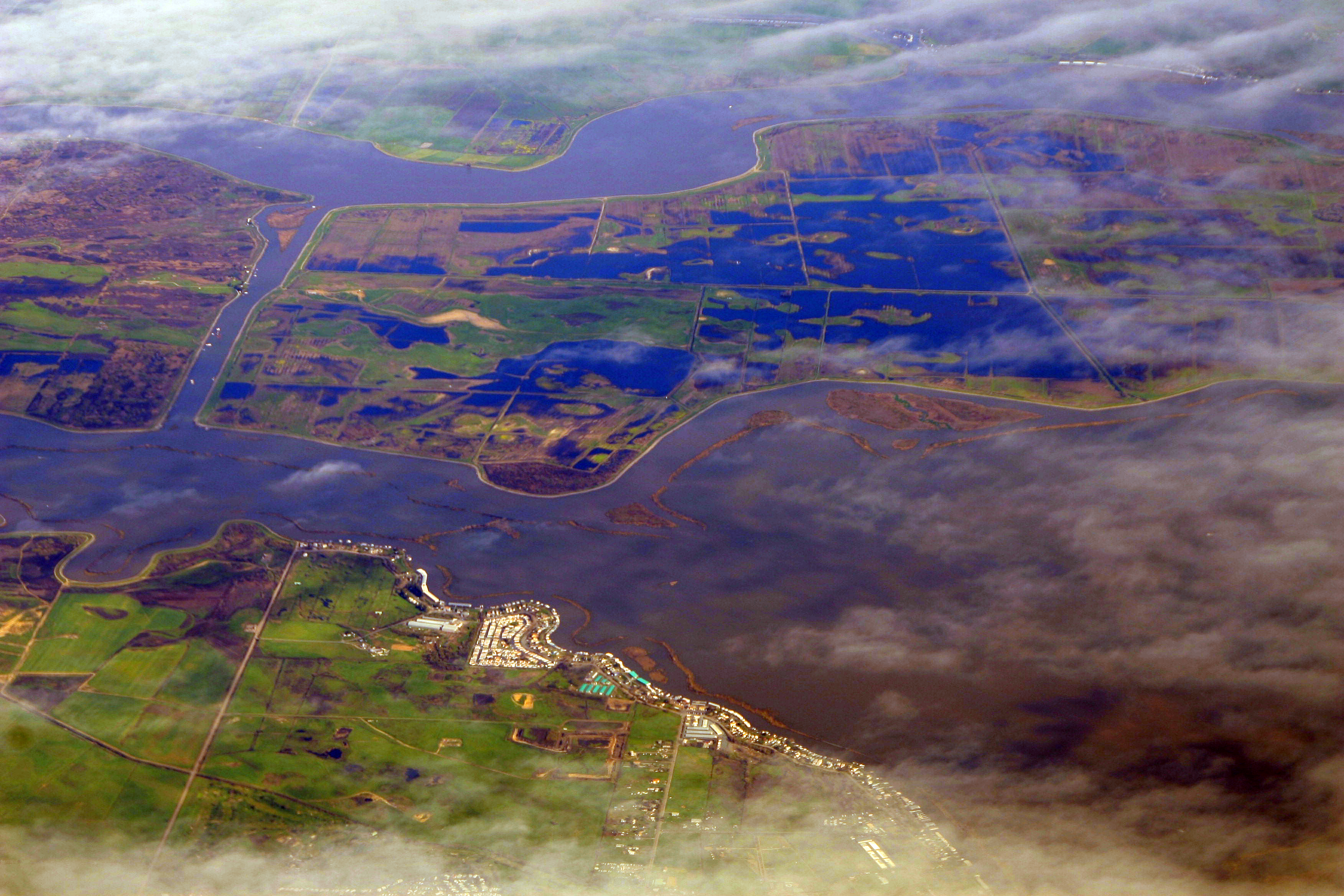
Sacramento–San Joaquin Delta at flood stage, spring 2009. Photo by Doc Searls.

Since 1900, there have been over 160 levee failures in the Sacramento–San Joaquin River Delta. These numbers include multiple failures of a single levee structure. Levee failures, also known as breaches, can be caused by overtopping or structural failure. One of the most recent examples of levee failure in the Sacramento–San Joaquin River Delta occurred in June 2004 when a levee breach caused more than 150,000 acre-feet (190,000,000 m^{3}) of water to flood the entire island of Jones Tract.

But, the significant improvements made to the Delta levee system since 1982 have reduced the incidence of failures to this one major failure in 30 years. The most up-to-date description and discussion of the Delta levee system can be found in the Economic Sustainability Plan of the Delta Protection Commission. This study concluded that the Delta levee system is now relatively robust but should be improved to effectively eliminate the risk of failure in extreme floods and earthquakes. It emphasizes the significant value of the infrastructure that passes through the Delta, including water conveyance, in addition to life and property, and the value of the Delta as a Place.

A 2019 article states that "a catastrophic levee failure, defined as 20 islands flooding at once, has a 62 percent chance of occurring in the next two decades if subsidence isn’t addressed."

Simultaneous levee failures on the Delta's 57 islands in the wake of an earthquake which allow the inflow of brackish San Francisco Bay waters could threaten the water supply for the Central Valley, which includes both the irrigation water for its $17 billion agricultural economy and the drinking water for about 25 million people.

== Ecology ==
About 500 plant and animal species inhabit the Delta, which is one of the largest estuaries in western North America. Before agricultural development of the Delta region, the Delta's many islands were forested by Tule, bulrush, and various reeds that flourished in intermittently flooded, low-lying marshy areas. Over thousands of years, the growth and decay of the various swampland plants formed a layer of peat 50 feet (15 m) deep in places, hence the extremely high fertility of Delta soils. Sediment deposits formed natural levees around the borders of islands, where larger trees, mainly willows, were able to take root and form large riparian forests. The riparian forests were most pronounced along the Sacramento River and the lower Mokelumne River below its confluence with the Cosumnes River. More extensive woodlands were prominent on the fringes of the Delta bordering the riparian zones. Composed primarily of valley oak, box elder and Oregon ash, these oak woodlands grew in bands that stretched up to 3 miles (4.8 km) inland. Farther away from water sources, vegetation gave way to grassland. The water hyacinth has become one of the most destructive plants to the Delta water way. Within one year it will spread and cover as much as 6,500 square feet (600 m^{2}) of water space in one growing season. It has become a challenge to the agricultural community to eliminate. The plants spread by budding and spreading its seeds, and those seeds fall to the bottom of the water, where they can stay viable in the muck for years. The Hyacinth can form a mat up to 6 feet (1.8 m) thick, shutting off light and becoming acidic when they decompose.

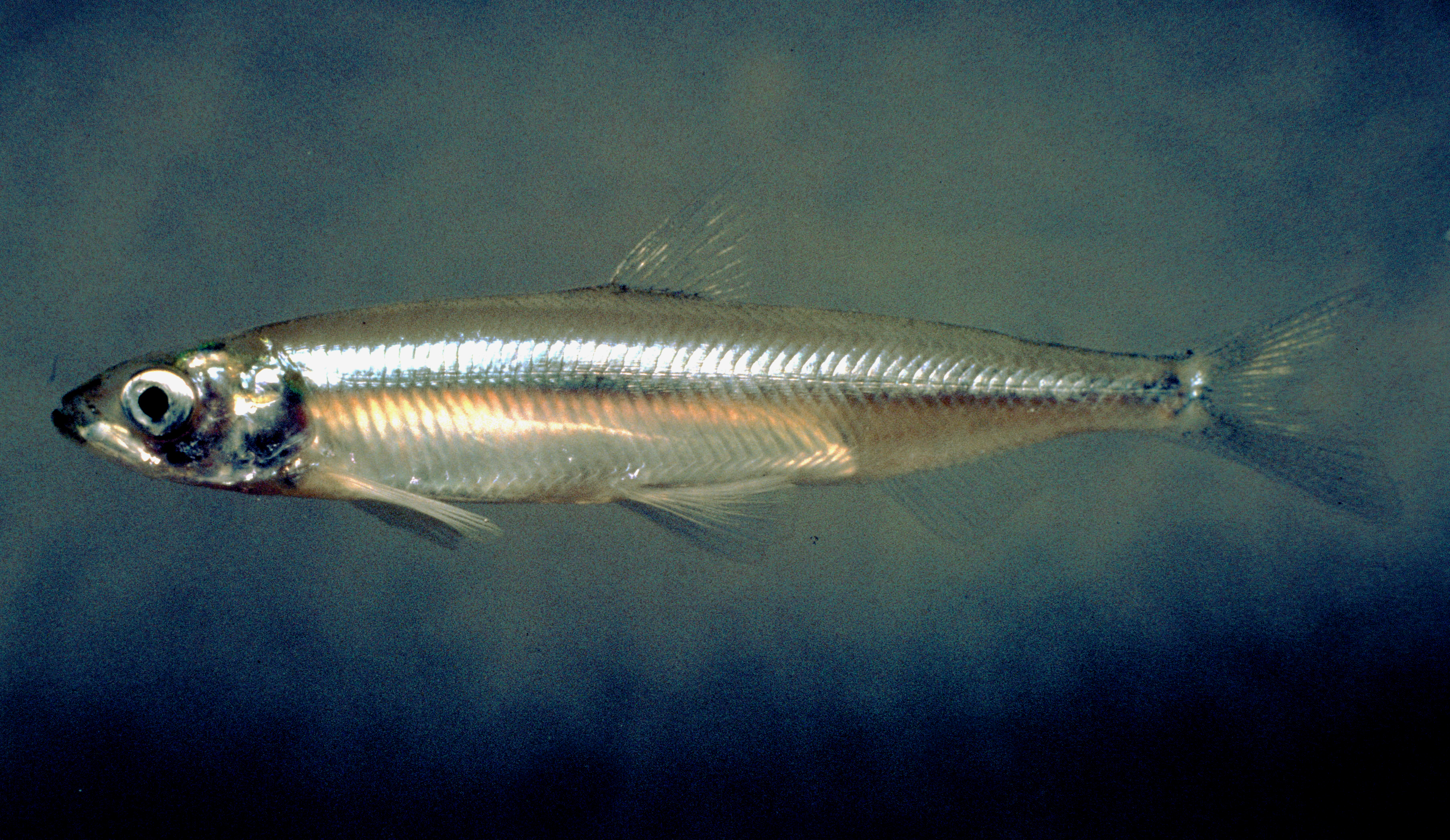
The tiny Delta smelt is an Endangered Species Act threatened species that has caused controversy over the amount of water that can be sustainably pumped from the Delta.

The Delta was formerly populated by large herds of deer and tule elk; their trails were so vast that early Spanish explorers supposed the area was inhabited by cattle. Significant numbers of California grizzly bears could also be found in the Delta. The extensive wetlands of the Delta supported massive bird populations, half the migrating waterfowl in California continue to pass through the Delta. A survey in 2012 recorded a spring duck population of 48.6 million, the highest since counts began in 1955. Large mammals in the Delta have not fared so well; with most of their habitat converted to agriculture, remaining populations were highly susceptible to human impacts and natural disasters. Grizzlies were hunted to extinction, while the flood of 1878 wiped out the last of the elk herds in the Delta.

The Delta is home to approximately 22 species of fish, including several Pacific salmon species, striped bass, steelhead trout, American shad and sturgeon. About two-thirds of California's salmon pass through the Delta on their way upstream to spawn. The small Delta smelt is a key indicator species for the health of the Delta's ecosystem. Delta fish populations have been significantly reduced due to the reclamation of marshland and diversions of fresh water. In 2004, the Delta smelt was found to be on the edge of extinction. The survival of the Delta smelt has been one of the largest environmental issues in California, as environmental measures enacted to protect its population have often reduced the amount of water available for federal water projects that depend on water pumped from the Sacramento–San Joaquin Delta.

The California Office of Environmental Health Hazard Assessment has issued a safe eating advisory for any fish caught in Central and South parts of the Delta due to elevated levels of mercury and PCBs. In addition, there is a notice of "DO NOT EAT" for any fish or shellfish from the Port of Stockton. There is a separate safe eating advisory for the Northern part of the Delta. A 2010 study shows that the anglers in the Delta who ate these fish had higher levels of mercury in their system. Delta fish have also been found to have high levels of a toxin called methylmercury which originates from old gold rush era mines in the Sierras. In that same study, it was found that women along the delta were consuming high numbers of fish, making them more susceptible to poisoning.

Nutria were found in Merced County in 2017 on the edge of the Delta. State officials are concerned that they will harm the infrastructure that sends water to San Joaquin Valley farms and urban areas.

The Delta has seen numerous cyanobacteria blooms with increasing frequency over the past two decades. Cyanobacteria have the potential to produce cyanotoxins which can pose a risk to humans and animals upon contact. Because of this cyanobacteria blooms are seen as a threat that has the potential to impact human life. Several types of toxic cyanobacteria have appeared in the Delta, with Microcystis aeruginosa being one of the most common types. Microcystis aeruginosa produce microcystins which are hepatotoxins that can cause liver cancer. Frequent Microcystis blooms have impacted the food web of the Delta at multiple trophic levels. Microcystis spp. blooms in the Delta were found to decrease the diversity of the aquatic microbial community. Additionally, the cyanobacteria blooms in the Delta have led to decreased zooplankton mass and density. There is also concern for further spread throughout the food web via bioaccumulation. Microcystins were detected in the tissue of clams at levels much higher than the ambient water around them because of microcystin's ability to covalently bind to tissue.

The increased occurrences of cyanobacteria blooms in the Delta can be attributed to a variety of factors with the most important being lowered streamflow. From 2004 through 2008 researchers collected different water quality parameters during the cyanobacteria blooms and determined that the blooms appeared after reaching a threshold of 19 °C (66 °F) which was exacerbated by reduced precipitation, reduced streamflow, and increased nutrient concentrations. They also determined that the negative attributes associated with climate change like reduced precipitation and increased temperatures could further increase the possibility of cyanobacteria blooms in the Delta. The high prevalence of nutrient concentrations in the Delta also plays a significant part in the increased frequency of Microcystis aeruginosa blooms. Microcystis benefits greatly from anthropogenic inputs of nitrogen which allows it to out-compete other primary producers and dominate the lower trophic levels. There have also been large amounts of nutrients monitored in the Delta as a result of various human activities.

The increased presence of Microcystis aeruginosa blooms in the Delta represents a continual threat for species at multiple trophic levels. The lower trophic levels are affected from both reduced diversity as well as reduced numbers through competition. When the conditions are met Microcystis have the ability to dominate the lower trophic levels hence why they are able to bloom. Additionally, when microcystins are present in the system then the consumers in the food web are at risk due to the effects of bioaccumulation. Fish that are present and active during cyanobacteria blooms can often have microcystin levels high enough to produce sublethal effects. Because microcystins can concentrate inside fish at multiple trophic levels it also represents a risk for human consumption as well.

== Conservation efforts ==
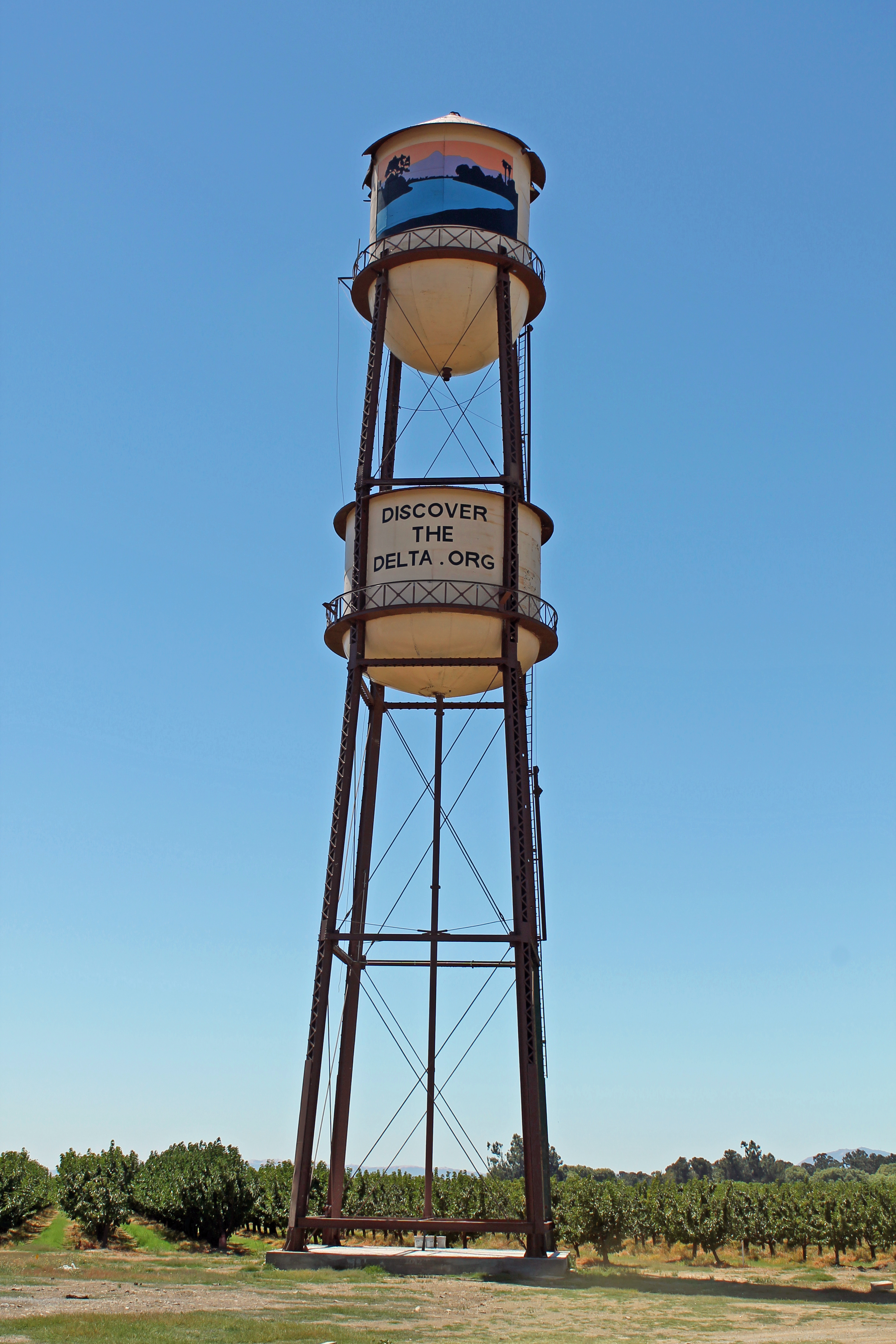
Water tower in Isleton, California

After numerous rounds of mitigation following the 2005 Smelt Biological Opinion (BiOp) lead to pumping restrictions from the State and Federal projects from the Delta, a number of potential solutions to the Delta's problems have been proposed. These followed the CALFED process which had offered several staged solutions. A first set of alternatives would maintain the Delta in its current condition and configuration. The second would restore parts of the Delta more closely to its natural state but include the construction of an additional Peripheral Canal to maintain the water supply currently provided by the Delta.

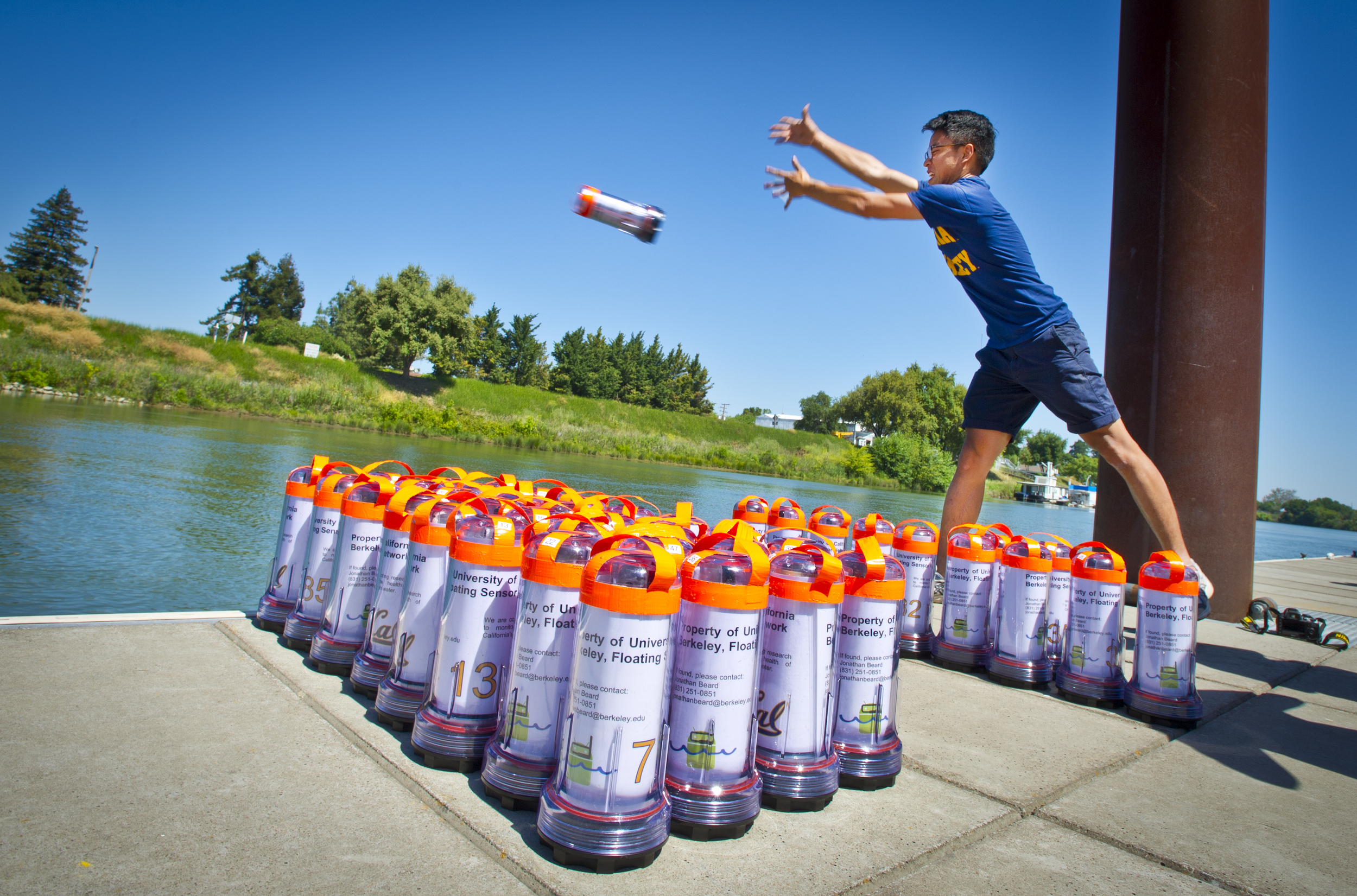
The launch of 100 floating sensors into the Sacramento River for the Floating Sensor Network project

The Contra Costa County Public Works Department is working with the California Coastal Commission and the Department of Boating and Waterways to protect the drinking water quality, prevent pollution, and promote the environmental health of the Delta.

In April 2009, the Sacramento River in the Delta was declared the nation's most endangered waterway system by the environmental group American Rivers, due to water shortages caused by the Delta's environmental problems, declining fish populations and aging levees, among other problems.

Since the 1940s, various groups have lobbied for the construction of a Peripheral Canal to redirect water flowing from the Sacramento and San Joaquin rivers directly to the federal aqueducts that draw water from the southern end of the Delta. Currently, freshwater entering the Delta has to flow through a maze of river channels and sloughs before entering the Clifton Court Forebay north of Tracy, where water is pumped into the California Aqueduct and Delta-Mendota Canal. In addition, large numbers of Delta smelt and other endangered species are killed by the pumping plants that provide water for the aqueducts.

The current proposal, known as the Bay Delta Conservation Plan, entails building twin tunnels under the delta and is closely associated with Governor Jerry Brown. However, the Peripheral Canal proposal has been criticized because it would further reduce the amount of freshwater flowing through the Delta. Farmers in the Delta are among the most opposed to the project because it would decrease the amount of water available to them for irrigation.

All solutions, however, aim to produce a Delta which simultaneously supports a vibrant ecosystem and continues to supply fresh water to the Central Valley Project, the State Water Project and the Bay Area.

Sacramento–San Joaquin Delta National Heritage Area was designated on March 12, 2019, the first such designation for California, as part of the John D. Dingell Jr. Conservation, Management, and Recreation Act. The Sacramento–San Joaquin Delta National Heritage Area is managed by the Delta Protection Commission.

== See also ==
- Big Break Regional Shoreline
- CALFED Bay-Delta Program
- John P. Irish, Delta landowner

== Works cited ==
- Pierce, Patricia (June 1988). "A Geoarchaeological Analysis of the Prehistoric Sacramento-San Joaquin Delta, California" (PDF). Calfed Bay-Delta Program.
- Reisner, Marc (2004). A Dangerous Place: California's Unsettling Fate. Penguin Books. ISBN 0-679-42011-8.
- Thompson, John (2006). "Early Reclamation and Abandonment of the Central Sacramento-San Joaquin Delta" (PDF). Sacramento History Journal. University of California Berkeley. Archived from the original (PDF) on July 18, 2013.
