= Sacramento State Men's Rowing Team =

California State University, Sacramento Men's Rowing Team
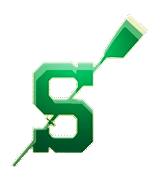

- Location: Sacramento State Aquatic Center, Sacramento, California, USA
- Home water: Lake Natoma
- Founded: 1984
- Key people: Chandler Bender (President); Anthony Hohman (Coach); Eric Weir (Coach)
- University: Sacramento State University
- Colors: Green and Gold
- Affiliations: WIRA
- Website: www.sacstaterowing.com

CSUS Men's 8+ in 2004

The Sacramento State Men's Rowing Team is a collegiate sports club representing the Sacramento State University in rowing. The program is a club sport, not affiliated with the university athletic department and is governed by elected club officers. Started in 1984 by students with head coach Steve Gallant, the crew is a member of the Western Intercollegiate Rowing Association (WIRA), whose participants are mostly non-Pac-10 schools on the West Coast.

As part of WIRA, the team has won multiple conference championships in the Varsity 8 and also had championship boats in several other events.

The team consists of male or female athletes and male or female coxswains. The team competes against schools such as Stanford, UC Davis, UC Berkeley, UC San Diego, Gonzaga, CSU Chico, CSU Stanislas, CSU Monterey Bay, and all other west coast institutions with rowing programs. In 2021, club transitioned to offer both men's and women's rowing within the program.

== Facilities ==
The team meets and rows at the Sacramento State Aquatic Center located at Lake Natoma, which is one of the top rowing facilities in the United States. The facility has a combination of multimillion-dollar facilities, stable year round weather, and the long, protected waters of Lake Natoma. Facilities at the aquatic center include rowing specific training equipment, weight room, locker rooms, and showers. The entire lake is surrounded by state park property which keeps the rest of the world from infringing on its waters. It is because of Lake Natoma that Sacramento State hosts most of the major rowing races in the Western US, and why the CSUS Men's Rowing Team has hosted the NCAA National Championships more than any other facility.

== Coaches ==
Head Coaches:

1984–1985	Steve Gallant
1985–1986	Merri Lisa Tigilio
1987–1988	Ned Troop
1989–1995	Bob Whitford
1996–2005	Sam Sweitzer
2006–2008	Brandon Hayes
2008–2009	Dustin Kraus
2009–2010	Tom McCoin
2010-2011	Dustin Kraus
2011-2012	Julian Geluk
2012-2013	Mike Brandt
2013-2016	Anthony Hohman
2016-2023	Eric Weir
2023-2024	Jay Reid
2025-Present	Kyle and Kian Brunberg
