= Barbwire Bowl Classic =

Fairground Aggies	Stockade Tech
6	0
Head coach: Johnny Polczynski	Head coach: Ed Tipton
	1	2	3	4	Total
FAI	0	0	6	0	6
STO	0	0	0	0	0
- Date: January 23, 1946
- Stadium: Stockton Ordnance Depot; Stockton, California
- Referee: Carlos Souza
- Attendance: 2,000

The Barbwire Bowl Classic was an American football game played at Stockton Ordnance Depot, California, on January 13, 1946, between German prisoners of war.

== Game ==
In December 1945, the commanding officer of Camp Stockton, Colonel Kenneth Barager, proposed a football game between the German prisoners of the main camp in Stockade and the smaller camp at the San Joaquin County Fairgrounds as part of the reeducation program for the POWs. Barager hoped the game would encourage the Germans to spread the sport of football in their home country upon being repatriated.

44 prisoners expressed interest in participating and received equipment through donations from organized football teams. Although the items were of quality, only the first-string players received certain articles like shoes, and only one player's helmet featured a facemask.

The Germans were split into two teams based on their station. The Fairgrounds players, who worked on tomato farms in the camp, were named the Fairgrounds Aggies, while those in the Stockade were dubbed Stockade Tech. The teams were later nicknamed after various figures: Fairgrounds, coached by former Marquette player Sergeant Johnny Polczynski, was called "Barager's Bears" after Barager; Stockade, led by Texas Longhorn Ed Tipton and backfield coach Captain James M. Kiernan Jr., was named "Kiernan's Krushers".

In the month before the game, both teams held practices. The Bears elected to use the double-wing formation as they hoped the Krushers would expect them to run the more popular T formation; in a photo for the camp's newspaper, the Bears also posed in the T formation.

On January 13, the game was held as part of a camp-wide sports festival. A soccer game was held prior to the football game, with the former's first half occurring before kickoff and the second half during halftime. Large grandstands were built for the game, with attendance ranging from 2,000 to 5,000 spectators and consisting of fellow prisoners and American military personnel; German paratrooper and running back Richard Statetzny described the fan excitement as mostly dominated by Americans since the POWs did not understand the sport's rules.

The Krushers scored first on a 30-yard touchdown run in the second quarter, but it was nullified by a holding penalty. In the third quarter, the team mounted a 90-yard drive that ended with a touchdown on a quarterback sneak by Hubert Lüngen. Lüngen, also a paratrooper and handball player, commented throwing a football was much more difficult as it required a different form than throwing a handball. Since his receivers struggled to catch the ball, the team relied on rushing plays, which resulted in numerous fights. The Bears could not score as the Krushers won 6–0.

After the game, the players changed into their military uniforms and assembled at the Officers' Club, where they were individually introduced and treated to a banquet and team photo. For Statetzny, the picture also served as identification when he was moved to different prison camps.

Unsatisfied with their first outing, the Bears intensified their preparations for the rematch four weeks later and won 20–0. Unlike the first game, the rematch did not have as much fanfare as the only spectators were Fairgrounds POWs.
