= Washington Lake (California) =

Lake in the state of California, United States

- Location within California
- Location: Yolo County, California
- Coordinates: 38°33′54″N 121°33′14″W
- Type: lake
- Surface elevation: 2 m (6 ft 7 in)

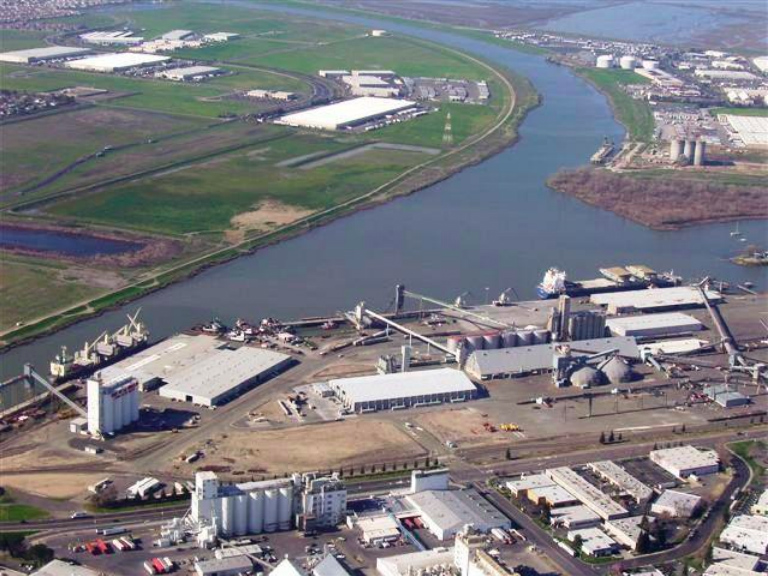
Port of West Sacramento on Washington Lake, looking southwest; Sacramento Deep Water Ship Channel at top

Washington Lake is the location of the Port of Sacramento (also known as Port of West Sacramento), in West Sacramento, California.

Lake Washington hosts seagoing ships along with the Lake Washington Sailing Club (LWSC) and the River City Rowing Club (RCRC). During summers there can be classes to learn how to row and sail.
