= Sacramento Deep Water Ship Channel =

Canal in Sacramento County, California, United States

Sacramento River Deep Water Ship Channel
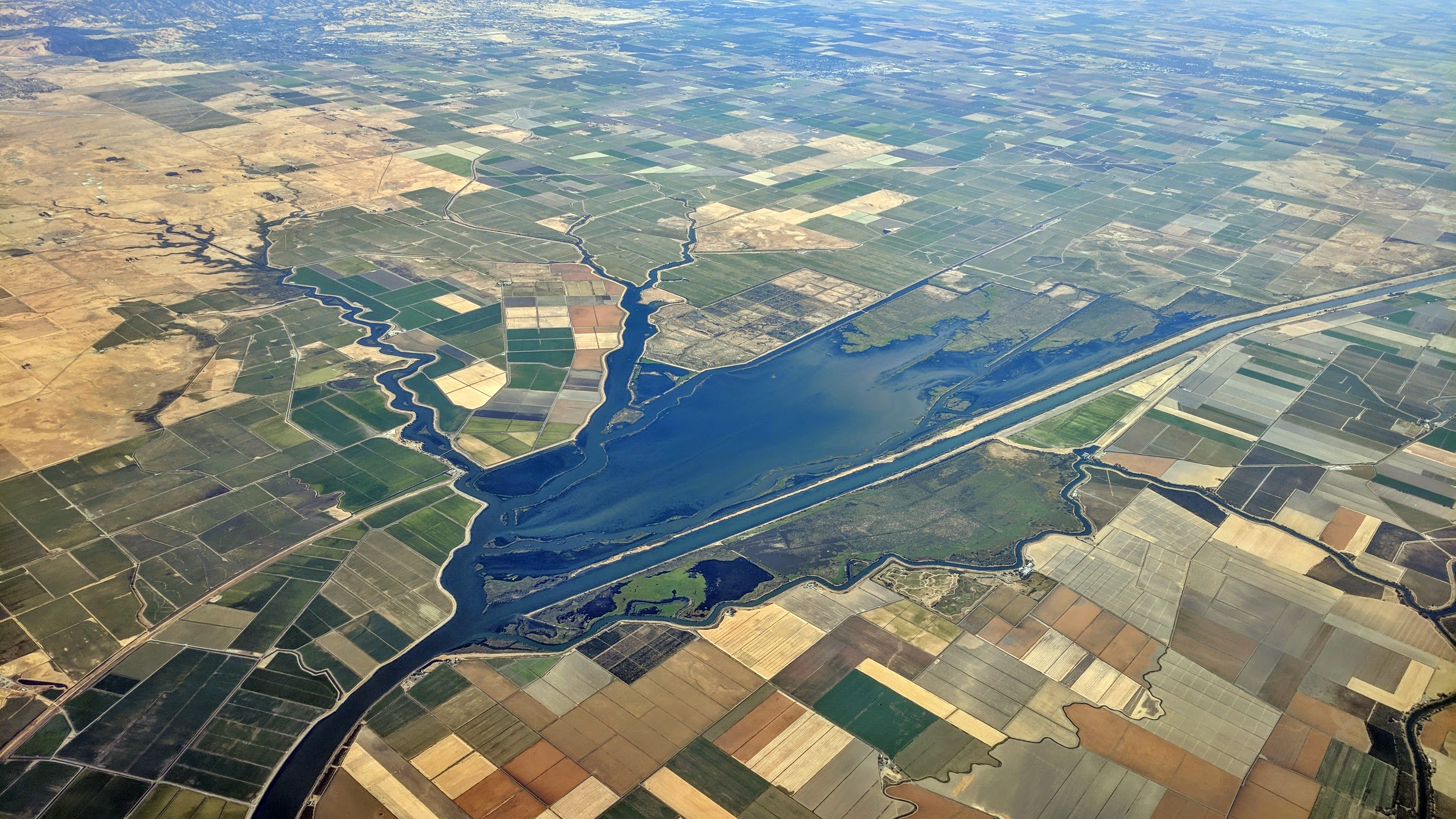
- Aerial view of the Sacramento River Deep Water Ship Channel and some adjoining and nearby sloughs and farm country. Dixon and Davis are visible in the distance.

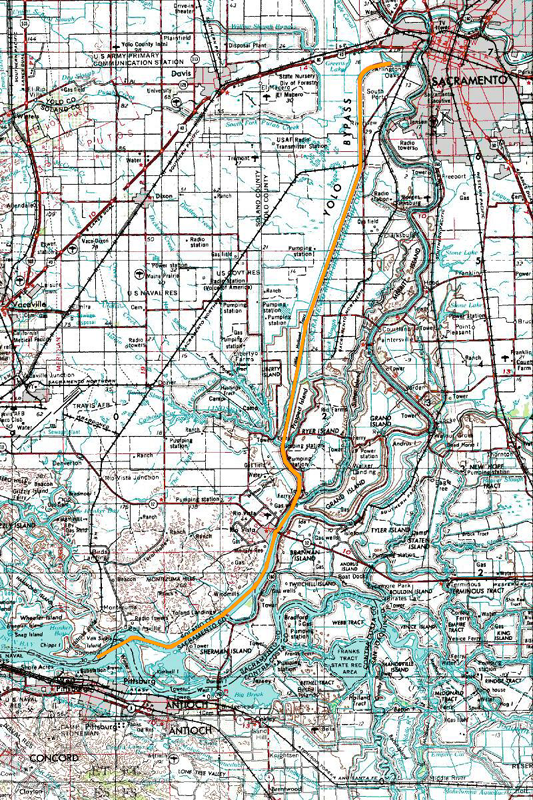
- Map of the Sacramento Deep Water Ship Channel
- Location: Solano County / Yolo County, California
- Country: United States
- Coordinates: 38.12547°N 121.69662°W

Specifications
- Length: 43 miles (69 km)
- Maximum boat draft: 30 feet (9.1 m)
- Locks: 1 (closed)
- Navigation authority: U.S. Army Corps of Engineers

History
- Date approved: 1946
- Construction began: 1949
- Date of first use: June 1963

Geography
- Start point: Sacramento River
- End point: Port of Sacramento

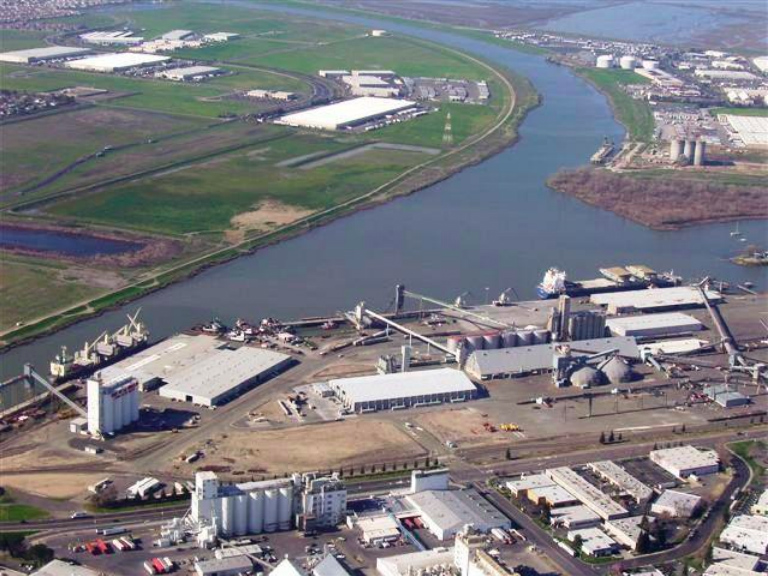
Port of West Sacramento on Washington Lake, looking southwest; channel at top

The Sacramento Deep Water Ship Channel (also known as Sacramento River Deep Water Ship Channel or SRDWSC) is a canal from the Port of Sacramento in West Sacramento, California, to the Sacramento River, which flows into San Francisco Bay. It was completed by the United States Army Corps of Engineers in 1963. The channel is about 30 feet (9.1 m) deep, 200 feet (61 m) wide, and 43 miles (69 km) long.

The Port of Sacramento is a significant port on the West Coast of the United States, but receives far less traffic than larger ports. It handles primarily agricultural products and other bulk goods rather than containers, which dominate the shipping market.

A plan to dredge the channel to 35 feet (11 m) stalled in 1990 because the Port of Sacramento was unable to finance its share of the cost. Nonetheless, there is still interest in the project. Updated environmental documents were prepared by the San Francisco Disctrict of the USACE in 2011.

The channel has one set of ships locks—the William B. Stone Sacramento Locks—located at the eastern terminus of the channel, where it meets the Sacramento River. These locks were decommissioned in the mid-1980s and de-authorized in 2000. While the locks were reactivated for a fish passage study in 2003 and 2004, they are currently non-operational.

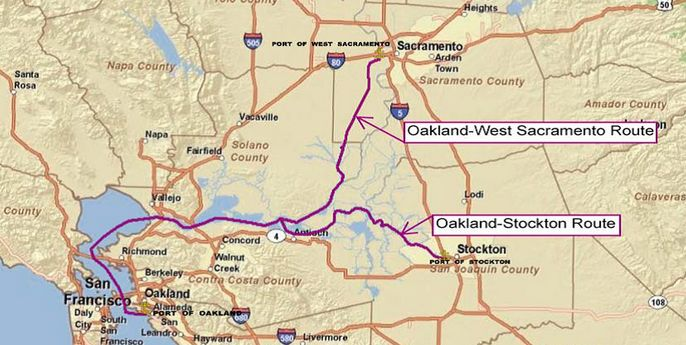
California's Green Trade Corridor

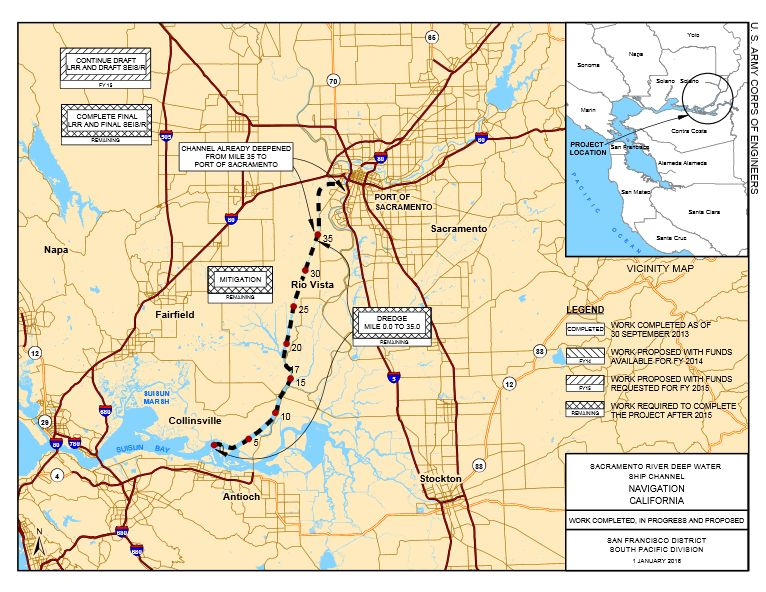
Port of Sacramento Deep Water Ship Channel map

== History ==
The Sacramento Deep Water Ship Channel was authorized by the River and Harbor Act of 24 July 1946. It is a modification of, and a supplement to, the Sacramento River Shallow Draft Navigation Project, which was adopted by the River and Harbor Act of 3 March 1899 and was started in September 1899 and completed in 1904. Although the Deep Water Ship Channel project was authorized in 1946, with construction started in 1949, it was stopped in 1950 and did not start again till 1956, with ship operation not until June 1963.

The channel is part of the California Green Trade Corridor project. Green Trade Corridor Marine Highway (ports of Oakland-Stockton-West Sacramento) can improve goods movement through Northern California.

== Flora and fauna ==
Sea lions have been spotted at the far eastern terminus of the Sacramento Deep Water Ship Channel, at approximately 38°33'04.3"N 121°34'46.6"W, as have American white pelicans, at approximately 38°33'04.3"N 121°34'46.6"W.

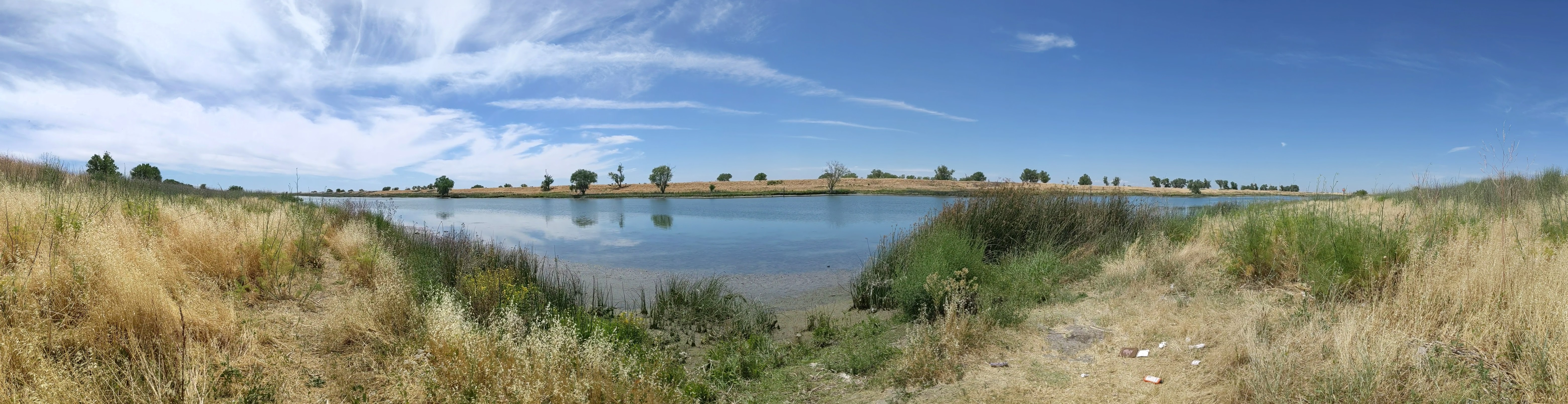
View of the channel from Levee Access Road at Marshall Road in West Sacramento

== See also ==
- Stockton Deepwater Shipping Channel
- California Heartland
- City of West Sacramento
- United States Army Corps of Engineers
- Container on barge
