= Port of Sacramento =

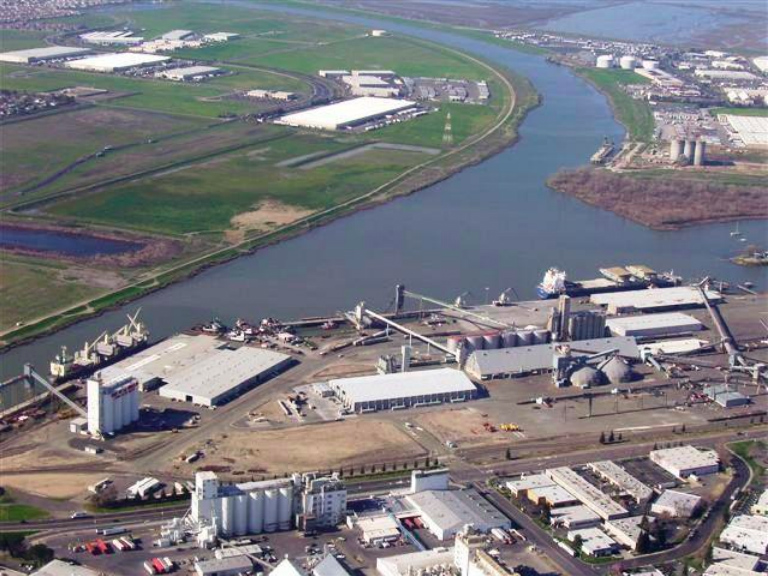
- Port of Sacramento
- Interactive map of Port of Sacramento

Location
- Country: United States
- Location: Sacramento, California
- Coordinates: 38.564173°N 121.549473°W

Details
- Opened: 1963
- Land area: 480 acres (1.9 km^{2})
- No. of berths: 5

Statistics
- Vessel arrivals: (CY 2014)
- Annual cargo tonnage: 1 million metric revenue tons (CY 2014)
- Value of cargo: US$145 million (CY 2014)

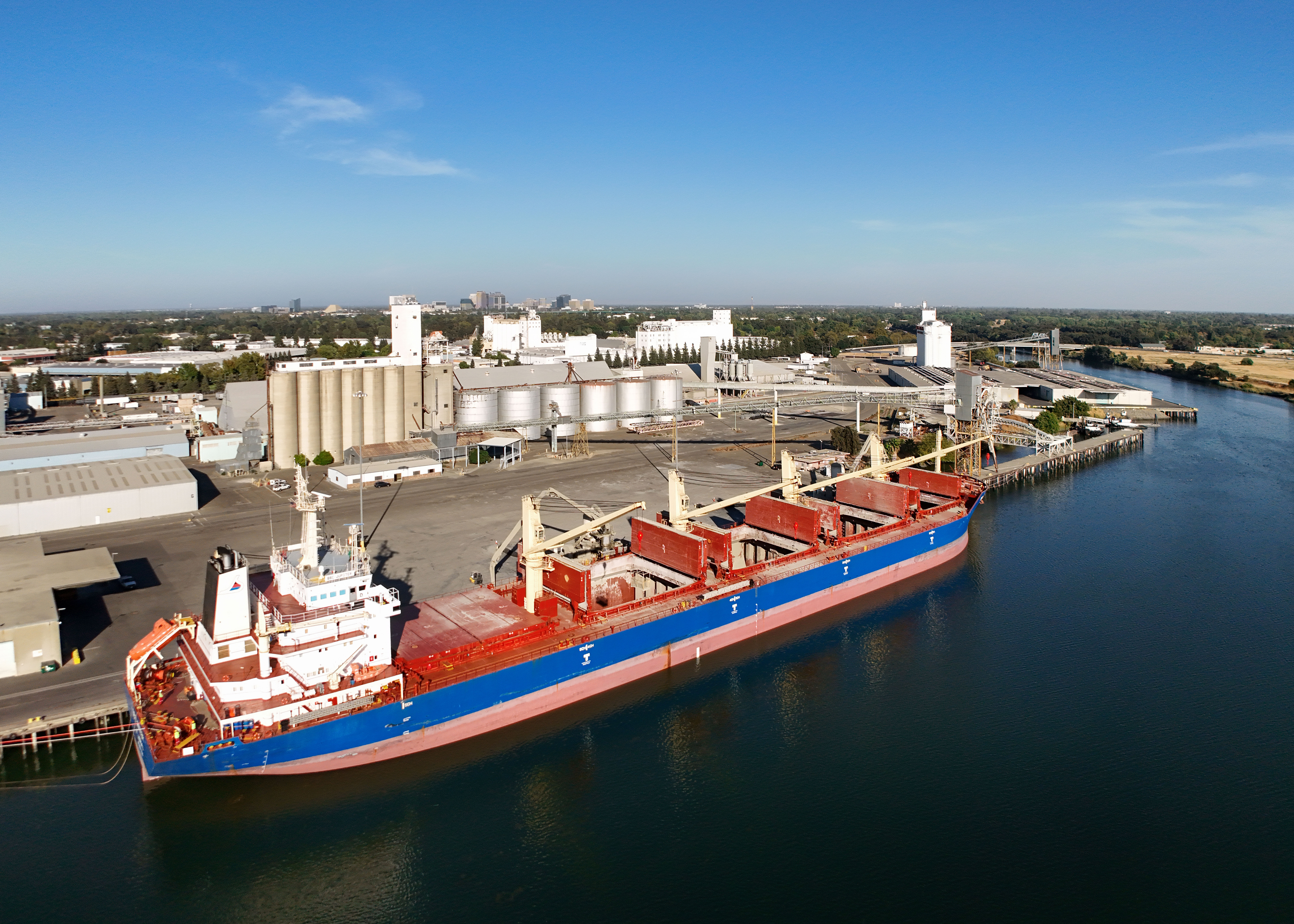
A bulk carrier docked at the port

The Port of Sacramento, now known as the Port of West Sacramento, is an inland port in West Sacramento, California, in the Sacramento metropolitan area. It is 79 nautical miles (146 km) northeast of San Francisco, and is centered in the California Central Valley, one of the richest agricultural regions in the world.

== History ==
Construction of the Port of Sacramento was first approved by Congress under the Rivers and Harbors Act of July 24, 1946. This act approved the construction of the Sacramento Deep Water Ship Channel, a 30-foot-deep, 43-mile-long shipping channel from Suisun Bay to an inland harbor at Washington Lake. The project started construction 3 years later in 1949 and the port was opened to deep sea traffic in 1963.

== Operations ==
Since July 1, 2013 the port and its operations are being leased by SSA Marine from the Port of Sacramento for a minimum of 5 years for a minimum annual payment of $650,000. This move by the port is intended to allow it to shift focus on developing its other available real estate assets, and further the growth of the port. It also transfers all liabilities and operational expenses to SSA Marine.

== Cargo ==
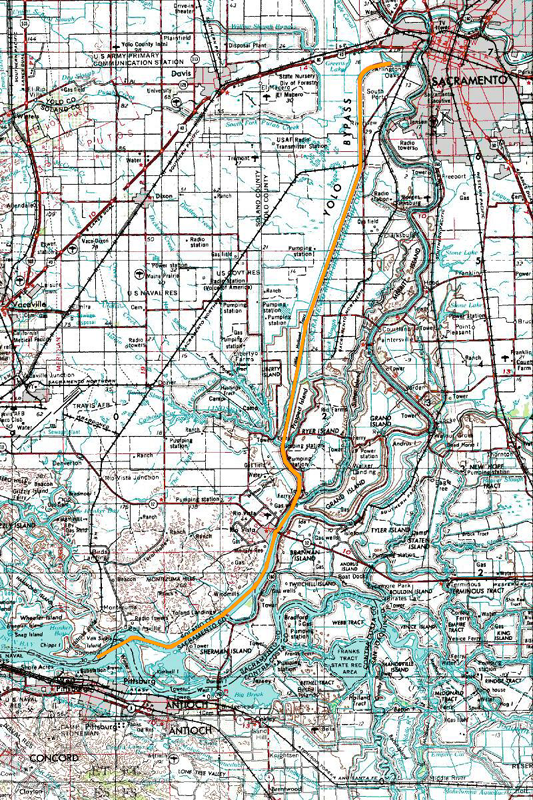
Map of the Sacramento Deep Water Ship Channel

The Port of Sacramento does not receive the high volume of ships that other California ports handle. This is mainly because the Port of Sacramento is a “Non-Container” port. The majority of all shipping worldwide is done by container ships, and the fact that the Port of Sacramento is not set up to handle this type of cargo cuts it out of a large percentage of port traffic. The Port of Sacramento's cargo is mainly of the agricultural, industrial and heavy equipment type, and the port specializes in bulk cargo. This works out well for the port because of its location in a dense agricultural region. Some of the ports’ main cargo is the exportation of local agriculture such as rice, barley, wheat, almonds and corn along with other local products such as lumber, cement, clay and metals. The Port of Sacramento is also set up to handle heavy machinery such as wind turbines, steel, generators and transformers.

== Port services ==
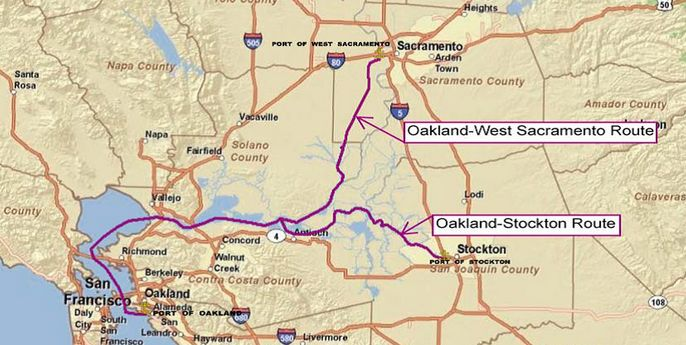
California's Green Trade Corridor Marine Highway project to Port of Sacramento

The channel depth is about 30 feet (9.1 meters), and length is 43 miles. The port area is 1,112 acres. With one 120-ton mobile harbor crane, the port specializes in bulk, break-bulk, agriculture, and construction cargo (no containerization shipments).

For rail, the port has both Union Pacific (UP) and Burlington Northern Santa Fe (BNSF) railroads lines for North America shipping. Local rail service is provided by the Sierra Northern Railway. The port is served by highways: Interstate 5, Interstate 80 and California State Route 99.

The port is part of the California Green Trade Corridor project, as ships move cargo much greener than trucks and trains. Green Trade Corridor Marine Highway (ports of Oakland-Stockton-West Sacramento) can improve goods movement through Northern California.

== Recent developments ==
The Port of West Sacramento is an independent special district created by the State of California, governed by a commission of four appointees by the Mayor of West Sacramento and one by the county board of supervisors. The port is managed by the city of West Sacramento and has projects to expand the services of the port. In February 2010 in partnership with the ports of Oakland and Stockton, the Port of Sacramento has received a $30 million award from the United States Department of Transportation (D.O.T.) as part of its America's Marine Highway Program. This program is designed to increase the amount of goods transported across the U.S. on ships and therefore decrease the amount transported by trucks and rail. This is thought to have many environmental and economic benefits. This funding will be used to start a movement of containers between all three of these ports. The Port of Sacramento has since used a portion of this funding in order to give it the ability to accept containers. The main thing they have done is purchased a crane that will allow the port to lift containers on and off the ships or barges. Sacramento has high hopes for its port to increase its cargo traffic and economic output with these advancements.

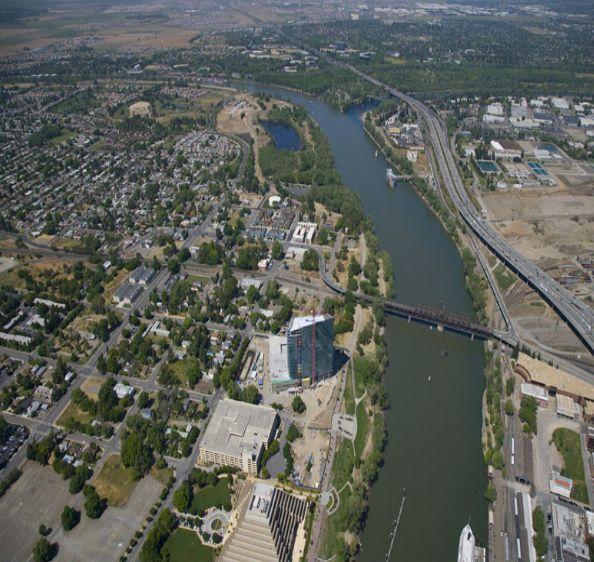
City of West Sacramento

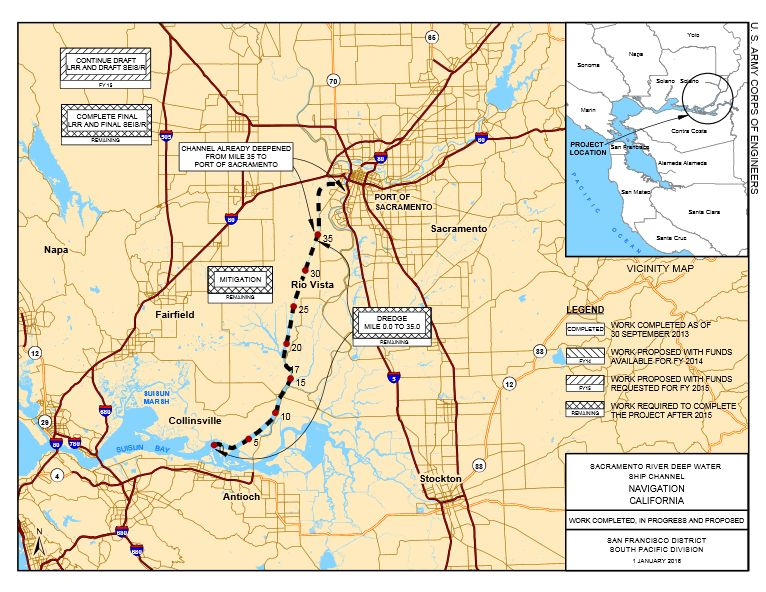
Port of Sacramento Deep Water Ship Channel map

== Environmental impacts ==
One of the main issues with the Port of Sacramento is that the Deep Water Ship Channel needs to be regularly dredged to maintain an adequate depth for oceangoing ships. This dredging process presents a number of problems, including how it impacts the water quality. One measure of quality is the salinity of the water. As the channel is deepened, more salt water from the bay enters the system to maintain sea level, which is an issue because the affected area includes drinking water intakes. These intakes require that the water be below a certain maximum salinity level that can be exceeded due to the dredging. The salinity of the water can also have negative effects on local fisheries.

Dredging also disturbs rare and endangered species. One of these species is the Delta smelt which has its main spawning grounds in and around the Sacramento Deep Water Ship Channel. The dredging itself can harm the spawning habitat directly by destroying eggs placed by the fish in the dredging zone. The spawning habitat can also be disturbed by the increase in salinity, the increased traffic the dredging will allow, and the noise created while dredging.

Another species affected by the dredging and the water quality is the winter run salmon. In order to maintain the water quality needed for this species' habitat, additional releases from upstream reservoirs will need to be made. These releases will negatively affect the amount of water stored in the reservoirs, which is needed for drinking water, agricultural purposes as well as providing cold water flows for the migration of the salmon. In other words, there may not be enough fresh water to make sure the salinity levels are maintained under the maximum amounts as well as serve all the other needs of the ecosystem and the people in the area.

Another water quality issue is the dredging process itself agitates the underwater landscape and releases sediment into the surrounding water. Also many times the dredged material is placed on the tops of levees which is subject to erosion into the surrounding waters during rains. The dredging does allow shipping to continue through the channel, which does confer some environmental benefit by eliminating 24,585 trips by trucks along the Interstate 80 corridor.
