= Port of Stockton =

Deepwater port in the United States

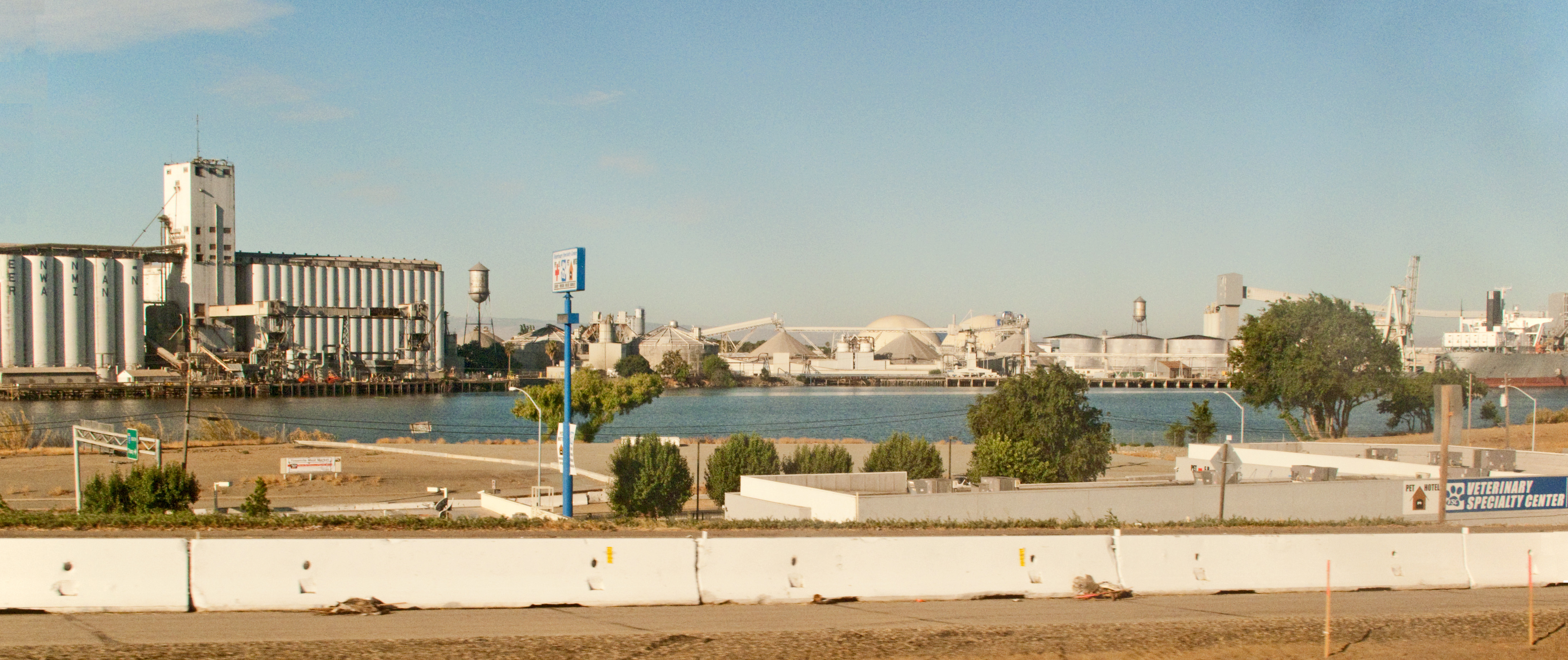
- Port of Stockton
- Interactive map of Port of Stockton

Location
- Country: United States
- Location: Stockton, California
- Coordinates: 37.95164°N 121.31764°W
- UN/LOCODE: USSCK

Details
- Opened: 1933
- Land area: 4,200 acres (17 km^{2})
- No. of berths: 15

Statistics
- Vessel arrivals: 252 (CY 2024)
- Annual cargo tonnage: over water and over land 6.8 million metric revenue tons (CY 2024)
- Value of cargo: US$1.76 billion (CY 2024)
- Website www.portofstockton.com

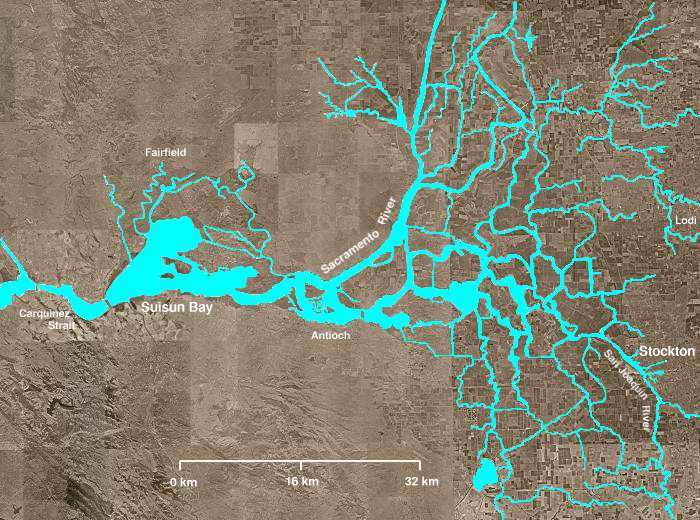
Northern California's Sacramento-San Joaquin River Delta. The Sacramento River flows into the delta from the north and the San Joaquin River from the south through Stockton. Map show how far inland the Port of Stockton is.

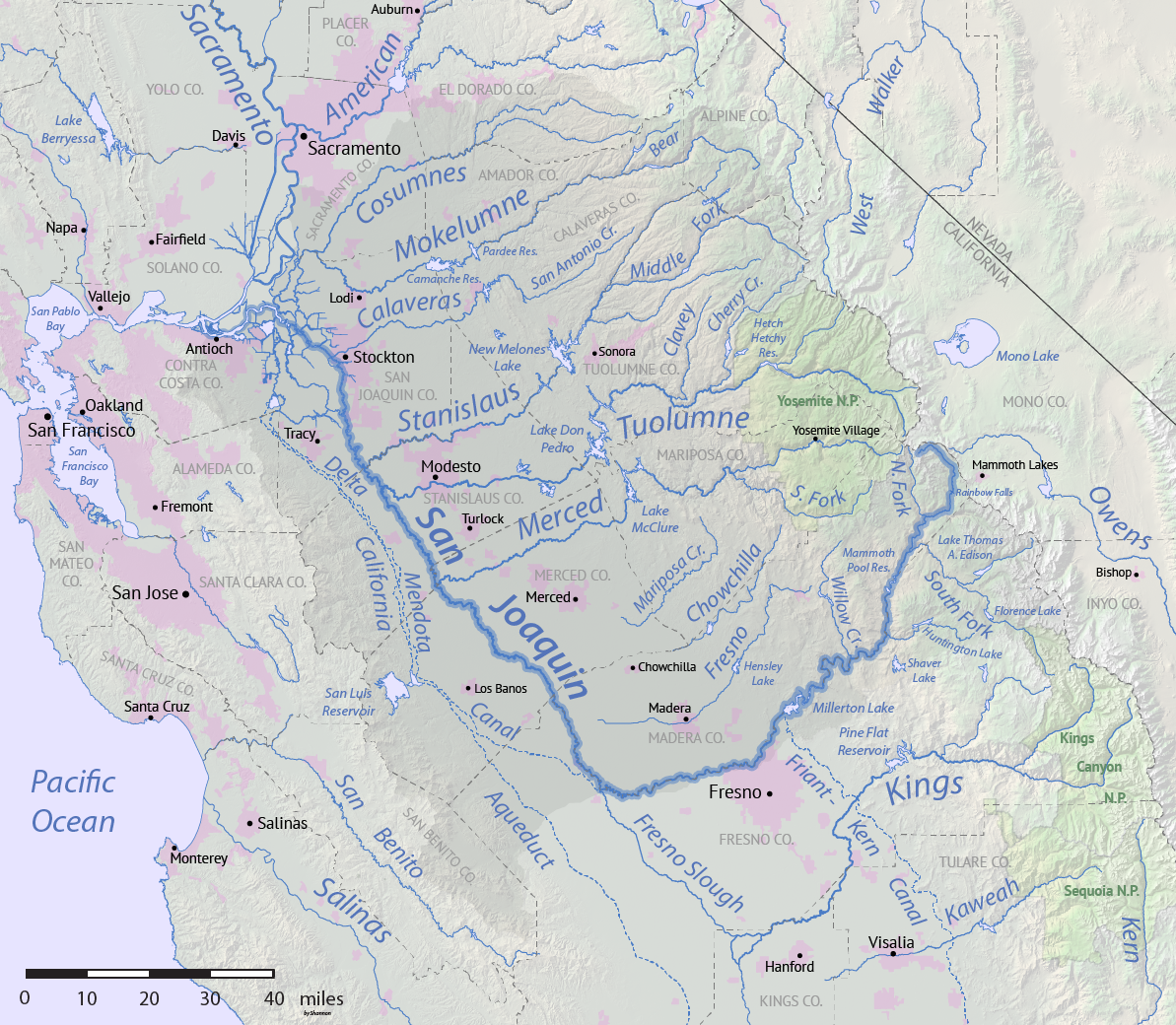
Map showing the Port of Stockton on the San Joaquin River

The Port of Stockton is a major deepwater port on the Stockton Ship Channel of the Pacific Ocean and an inland port located more than seventy nautical miles from the ocean, in Stockton, California on the Stockton Channel and San Joaquin River-Stockton Deepwater Shipping Channel (before it joins the Sacramento River to empty into Suisun Bay). By land acreage, the Port of Stockton is the 2nd largest port in the State of California and sits on about 4,200 acres (17 km^{2}), and occupies an island in the Sacramento–San Joaquin River Delta, and a portion of a neighborhood known as Boggs Tract. The day-to-day is run by the Port Director (CEO) and it is governed by a commission appointed by the City of Stockton and San Joaquin County. The Port of Stockton is a self-sustaining economic powerhouse in the Central Valley and in 2024, contributed over $78 million in state and local tax funds.

== Geography ==
The only natural outlet for the waters of the Central Valley to pass into the sea is through the narrow Carquinez Strait, at the inland eastern extreme of San Pablo Bay. Further inland are the Suisun and Grizzly Bays, arms of the Pacific Ocean deep in the Californian interior. Further inland again from these last bays is the broad Sacramento–San Joaquin River Delta, formed where the San Joaquin and Sacramento Rivers meet and cross together. This verdant triangle of land with deep black soils is at the heart of the Central Valley and stretches some fifty miles from Suisun Bay on the west to the cities of Stockton and Sacramento on the east. The Port of Stockton is the 2nd largest port in the State of California with 4,200 acres.

== Pollution ==
As a center of transport and commerce in a densely populated city, the Port of Stockton is conscientious about Port-related emissions that may impact local air quality and climate change. In 2024, the Port successfully undertook several efforts to reduce emissions and enhance planning efforts to transition to a cleaner, greener future - while ensuring cargo moves efficiently. The Port of Stockton has launched an ambitious effort to one day eliminate Port-related emissions entirely, and in the meantime, to significantly reduce impacts on neighbors. Efforts include a Clean Air Plan, a Medium- and Heavy-Duty Vehicle Electrification Blueprint, and Truck Access Analysis.

== History ==
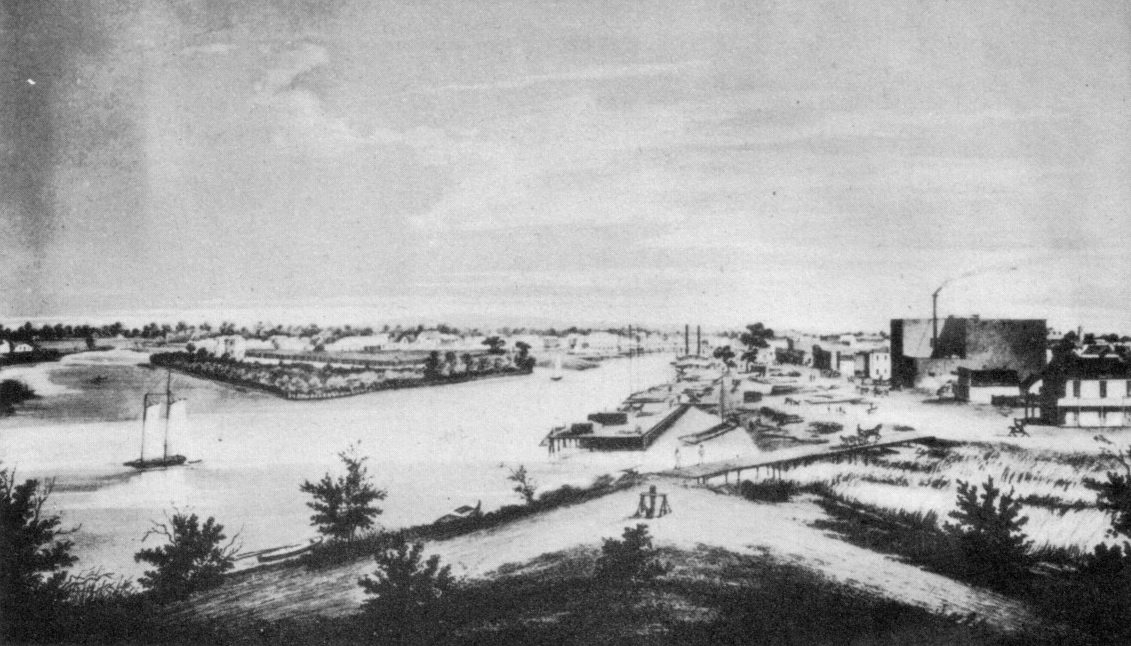
Stockton, California circa 1860

In 1846, the first cargo boat ascended the San Joaquin River. In 1848, John Doak established the first ferry service on the river, and the first freight vessel, the sloop Maria, visited Stockton. In 1849, Doak brought lumber from San Francisco to Stockton and began a lumber business. By the 1850s, the port had become a center of commodity shipping and the supply center for the California goldfields. By the 1860s, the region saw a decline in gold production and an increase in agriculture.

The first dredging contracts for the Stockton Deepwater Channel were awarded in 1930. The Port District officially opened on February 2, 1933, when the ship Daisy Grey arrived bringing lumber from Oregon.

During World War II, when an attack on coastal California seemed likely, the U.S. War Department requested some ships be built at an inland port, so many new ships were built at the Port of Stockton area.

Port management recognized the increasing importance of containerized cargo and upgraded dock side facilities. The ship channel was improved in order to accommodate large Panamax class ships.

The Navy Rough and Ready Island Naval Supply Depot built during World War II was phased out of use as a result of special federal legislation sponsored by U.S. Sen. Dianne Feinstein (D-CA) in 1995. It was transferred to the port between 2000 and 2003. This area of the port is now known as the "West Complex".

== Port services ==
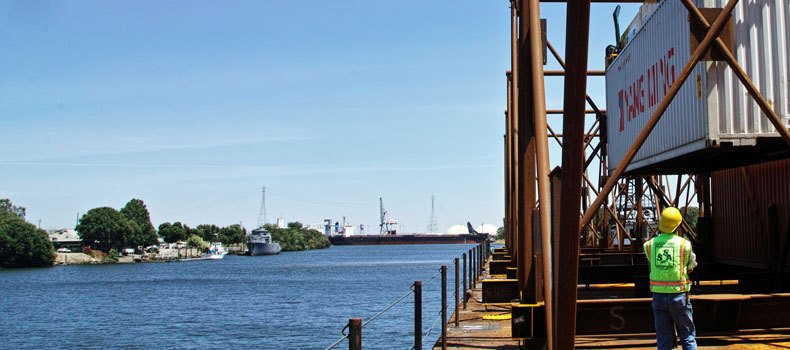
Port of Stockton worker moving a container

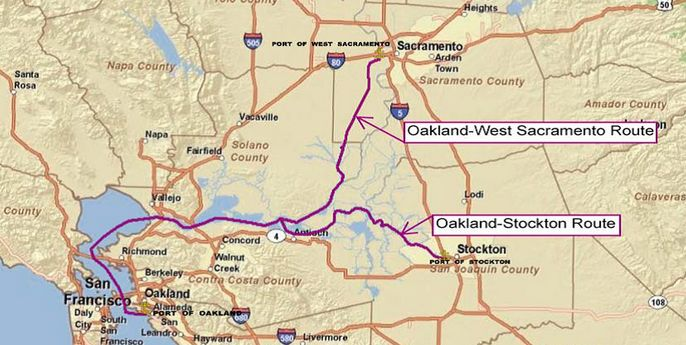
California's Green Trade Corridor Marine Highway project to Port of Stockton

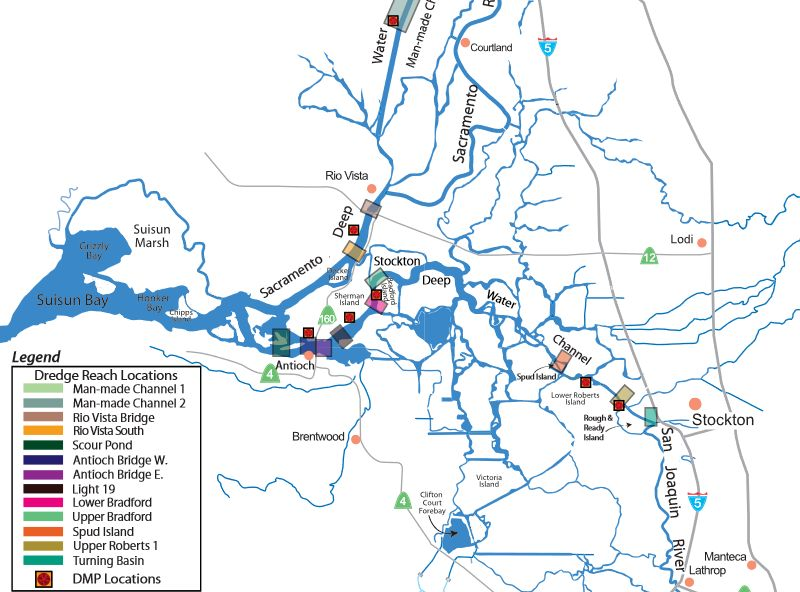
Stockton Deep Water Shipping Channel

- The deepwater channel is about 35 feet (11 meters) deep, handling ships up 900 feet (270 meters) and 60,000 tons. Dockside transit sheds of up to 1.1 million square feet (100 thousand square metres). Warehouse storage of up to 7.7 million square feet (720 thousand square metres).
- The Port is a Foreign Trade Zone.
- The port has two 140-ton mobile harbor cranes.
- The port handles both large volume of bulk cargo and breakbulk cargo shipments. It is the 4th busiest port in the State of California in relation to vessel calls.
- The port is served by three railroads: Central California Traction Company handles local rail shipments while Union Pacific (UP) and Burlington Northern Santa Fe (BNSF) provide rail connections to the rest of North America. Port of Stockton has 75 miles of rail lines shipping over 3 million short tons a year.
- The port is serviced by Interstate 5, California State Route 4, and California State Route 99. Over 200 truck companies serve the Port. Interstate 80 is about 50 miles north of the port.
- The port is part of the California’s Green Trade Corridor Marine Highway project, as ships move cargo much greener than trucks and trains. Green Trade Corridor Marine Highway (ports of Oakland-Stockton-West Sacramento) can improve goods movement through Northern California.
