= Holt (surname) =

Holt is a surname.

== Etymology ==
Holt is a surname and placename, of Proto-Germanic origin and meaning a small wood or grove of trees. It derives from the Old English word holt and is a near-synonym of "wold" (from Old English wald), originally denoting a forested upland. Those words are cognate with the modern German words "Holz" and "Wald" respectively.

The word is also found in Scandinavian placenames and in surnames derived from them: in Danish, Norwegian, and Icelandic as Holt (or the more archaic Danish Holdt and Holte); in Swedish as Hult or Hulte; and even in Finnish as Hulti (a loanword from Swedish). It is often used in combination with other words, as in Uhrenholdt ("ancient holt", a Danish last name taken from that of an estate) or Älghult ("elk holt"), a village and the site of a small art-glass factory in Småland, Sweden. In Sweden it is most commonly found in and around Småland, including Älmhult, the location of the first IKEA store.

Another spelling of the name is "Hoult", more commonly found in the north of England than in the south.

Related German names include Holz, Holzman, Holzhauer, et al., and their anglicized equivalents which often insert a "t" between the "l" and the "z".

== Notable people named Holt ==
- A. E. Holt White (1851–1933), English non-fiction writer and illustrator
- Alfred Holt (1829–1911), English steamship designer and ship owner
- Alfred Holt (cricketer) (1863–1942), English cricketer
- Anne Holt (born 1958), Norwegian crime novelist and lawyer
- Andrew Holt (disambiguation), several people
- Arthur Holt (sportsman) (1911–1994), Hampshire cricketer and Southampton footballer
- Arthur Holt (politician) (1914–1995), English politician
- Benjamin Holt (1849–1920), American machinery inventor
- Bob Holt (disambiguation), several people
- Brian Van Holt (born 1969), American actor
- Brock Holt (born 1988), American baseball player
- Caleb Holt (born 2007), American basketball player
- Chad Holt (1972–2019), American actor, writer, and criminal
- Charles A. Holt (born 1948), American behavioral economist
- Charles C. Holt (1921–2010), professor at McCombs School of Business, Texas
- Charlotte C. Holt, American activist and lawyer
- Chauncey Marvin Holt (1921–1997), Mob associate and self-claimed CIA operative
- Chris Holt (baseball coach) (born 1979), American baseball coach
- Chris Holt (ice hockey) (born 1985), goaltender
- Claire Holt (born 1988), Australian actress
- David Holt (musician) (born 1946), American musician
- David Holt (voice actor), English voice actor
- Edwin Holt (1873–1946), Harvard professor of philosophy and psychology
- Elaine Holt (born 1966), British businesswoman
- Ernest William Lyons Holt (1864–1922)
- Fritz Holt (1940–1987), American theatre producer and director
- Gary Holt (footballer) (born 1973)
- Gary Holt (musician) (born 1964)
- Georgia Holt (1926–2022), American singer
- Grant Holt (born 1981), English footballer
- Gwynneth Holt (1909–1995), British artist
- Hamilton Holt (1872–1951), former president of Rollins College
- Harold Holt (1908–1967), Prime Minister of Australia
- Harold Holt (impresario) (1885–1953), South African-English impresario
- Hazel Holt (1928–2015), British novelist
- Helen F. Holt (1913–2015), American politician
- Henry Holt (North Dakota politician) (1887–1944), lieutenant governor
- Henry Holt (publisher), of Baltimore, US; founded Henry Holt and Company (now Holt McDougal)
- Henry E. Holt (1929–2019), astronomer
- Henry H. Holt (1831–1898), Michigan politician, lieutenant governor
- Henry W. Holt (1864–1947), Associate Justice and Chief Justice of the Supreme Court of Virginia
- Herbert Samuel Holt (1856–1941), former president of the Royal Bank of Canada
- Homer A. Holt (1898–1975), American politician
- Jack Holt (actor) (1888–1951), American actor
- Jack Holt (dinghy designer) (1912–1995)
- Jefferson Holt, former manager of rock band R.E.M.
- Jennifer Holt (1920–1997), American actress
- Jim Holt (Arkansas politician) (born 1965)
- JoBea Way Holt (born 1954), planetary scientist
- John Holt (disambiguation), various people
- Joseph Holt (1807–1894), American judge
- Joseph Holt (rebel) (1756–1826), United Irish general
- Kåre Holt (1916–1997), Norwegian author
- Kristen Holt, Canadian educator and Abercrombie & Fitch model
- Lauren Holt (born 1991), American actress and comedian
- Lester Holt (born 1959), American news journalist
- Lou Holtz, American college football coach
- Luther Emmett Holt (1855–1924), pediatrician and author
- Luther Emmett Holt Jr. (1895–1974), pediatrician
- Marjorie Holt (1920–2018), United States representative from Maryland
- Maxwell Holt (born 1987), American volleyball player
- Michael Holt (author) (born 1929)
- Michael Holt (musician) (born 1968)
- Michael Holt (snooker player) (born 1978)
- Mike Holt (1931–2008), South African boxer (birth name Antione Michael Holthausen)
- Mister Terrific (Michael Holt), fictional character in the DC Universe
- Nancy Holt (1938–2014), American artist
- Olivia Holt (born 1997), American actress
- Orrin Holt (1792–1855), United States representative from Connecticut
- Peter Holt (born 1948), American businessman
- Pierce Holt (born 1962), American football player
- Randy Holt (born 1953), Canadian ice hockey player
- Redd Holt (1932–2023), American jazz and soul drummer
- Ric Holt, Canadian computer scientist
- Robert Holt (disambiguation), several people
- Rod Holt (born 1934), American computer engineer
- Rosie Holt, British actress, comedian and writer
- Rush D. Holt, Jr., a U.S. Representative from New Jersey
- Rush D. Holt, Sr., a U.S. Senator from West Virginia
- Ryves Holt (1696–1763), Chief Justice of the Delaware Supreme Court
- Sam B. Holt (1902–?), American college basketball coach
- Samuel C. O. Holt (1936–2023), American radio and television executive
- Sandrine Holt (born 1972), model and actress
- Saxon W. Holt (1871–1940), American politician from Virginia
- Seth Holt (1923–1971), British film director and producer
- Simeon ten Holt (1923–2012), Dutch composer
- Simma Holt (1922–2015), Canadian journalist and politician
- Simon Holt (born 1958), British composer
- Sophia Holt (1658–1734), Dutch painter
- Steve Holt (disambiguation), several people
- Susan Holt, Canadian politician in New Brunswick
- Terrence Holt (born 1980), American football player; younger brother of Torry Holt
- Terrence Holt (writer), American writer
- Thomas Holt (American architect), American architect
- Thomas Holt (English architect), English architect
- Thomas Michael Holt (1831–1896), textile manufacturer, whose company later became part of Burlington Industries
- Tim Holt (1919–1973), American actor
- Tim Holt (statistician) (1943–2022)
- Tom Holt (born 1961), British novelist
- Tonie Holt (1932–2024) and Valmai Holt (born 1935), British military historians, authors, and pioneers of the modern battlefield tour industry
- Torry Holt (born 1976), American football player; older brother of Terrence Holt
- Victor Holt (1908–1988), American basketball player
- William Holt (disambiguation), several people
- Yvette Holt (born 1971), Australian poet

== See also ==
- General Holt (disambiguation)
- Judge Holt (disambiguation)
- Justice Holt (disambiguation)
- Senator Holt (disambiguation)
- Holte (surname)
- Hult (disambiguation)
- Hult (surname)
