= Empire Tract =

Island in California

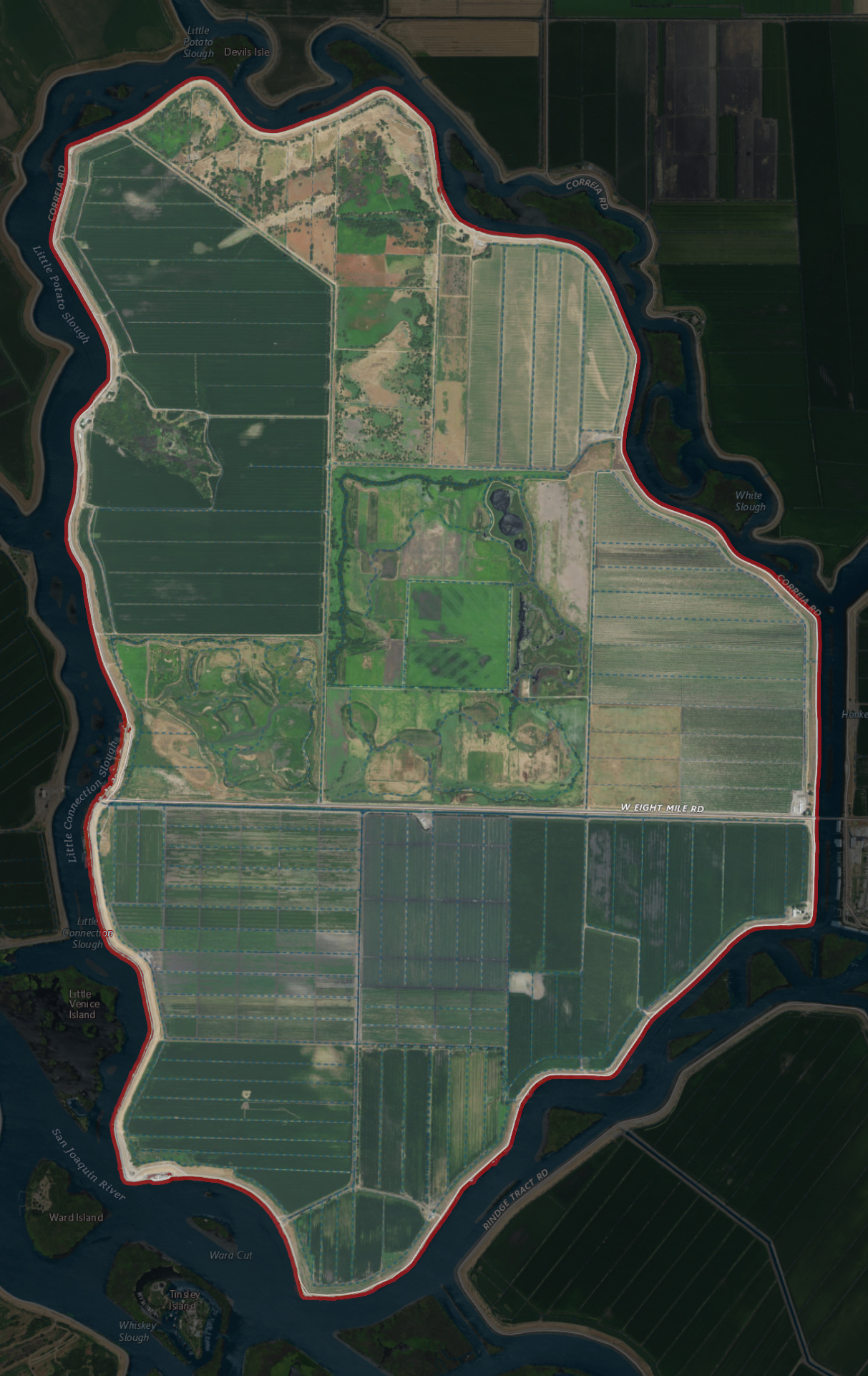
- USGS aerial imagery of the Empire Tract

- Location within Sacramento-San Joaquin River Delta Location within California Location within the United States

Geography
- Location: Northern California
- Coordinates: 38°03′55″N 121°28′48″W
- Adjacent to: Sacramento–San Joaquin River Delta
- Highest elevation: −10 ft (-3 m)

Administration
- United States
- State: California
- County: San Joaquin

The Empire Tract is an island in the Sacramento–San Joaquin River Delta in San Joaquin County, California, United States. It has been used for agriculture since the 1800s; in the early 20th century it was used to plant potatoes, and United States president Herbert Hoover operated a beet farm there. In the 1960s, natural gas deposits were discovered beneath the island. In 1936, it was connected to the mainland by the Eight Mile Road Bridge, across King Island. As with many islands in the Delta, the Empire Tract has experienced considerable subsidence, and is well below sea level.

== Geography ==
It is part of San Joaquin County, California, and managed by Reclamation District 2029. Its coordinates are 38°03′55″N 121°28′48″W, and the United States Geological Survey measured its elevation as −10 ft (−3.0 m) in 1981. To the north is Terminous Tract (across White Slough), and to the northwest is Bouldin Island (across Little Potato Slough). To its west is Venice Island (across Little Connection Slough). To its southwest are Little Venice, Ward, Tinsley, and Fern Islands (across the Ward Cut, part of the Stockton Deepwater Shipping Channel). To its southeast is the Rindge Tract, separated by Connection Slough, and to its east is King Island, separated by the approximately 400 ft (120 m) Honker Cut. The only road access to Empire Tract is the Eight Mile Road Bridge (29C-219), a two-lane bridge built in 1936, connecting to it from King Island. Ferry service runs between Empire Tract and Venice Island.

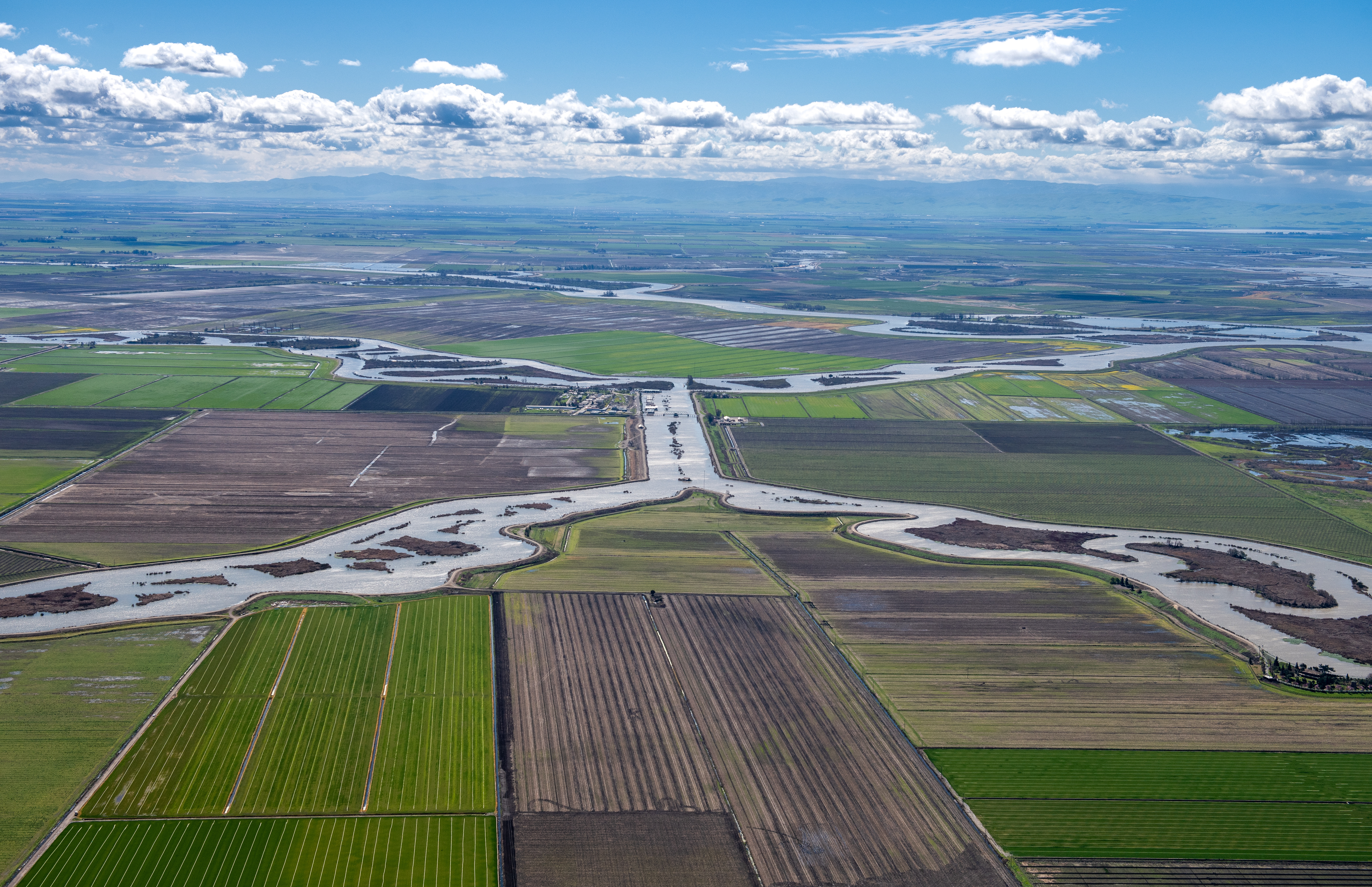
A 2019 aerial photo of White Slough taken looking south from the Terminous Tract; King Island is on the left and the Empire Tract is on the right.

== History ==
In December 1912, Lee A. Philips, a capitalist of Stockton and Los Angeles, purchased several islands in the California Delta, including the Empire Tract, which began to be planted in that year by the Empire Navigation Company. In 1912, 1,500 acres (610 ha) of barley had been planted on the Empire Tract. By 1913, the company planned to plant the tract with 3,310 acres (1,340 ha) of potatoes and only 400 acres (160 ha) of barley.

In a 1923 report on the hydrography of the San Joaquin River, the Empire Tract was measured as having 3,680 acres (1,490 ha) of land in total, with 3,361 acres (1,360 ha) irrigated. Of these, there were still 1,973 acres (798 ha) of potatoes, but there were also 865 acres (350 ha) devoted to growing fruit, 481 acres (195 ha) to beans, and 42 acres (17 ha) to hay. That year, 600 acres (240 ha) of the tract were farmed by a partnership between Philip Giriodi, D. Stagi, and G. Lazzarino. The next year, Giriodi would file a lawsuit against the others for a dissolution of the partnership, claiming that they had refused to pay him his share of the profits. Two years later, the island was to be owned in its entirety by California Delta Farms, Incorporated. California Delta Farms would continue to own the Empire Tract for some years, but by 1946 the company was dissolved.

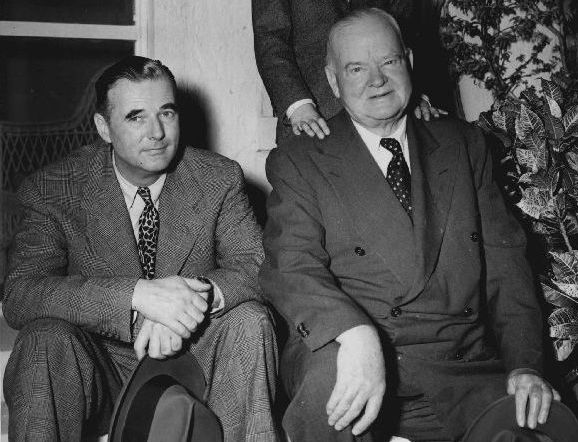
Herbert Hoover (right) with son Allan (left)

In the 1930s, United States president Herbert Hoover operated "extensive farming property" on the Empire Tract. In 1936, the Hoover Ranch, supervised by his son Allan Hoover, was the site of a "shooting affray" in which two men were killed in a dispute over wages for beets. Between 1931 and 1938, much of the island was devoted to farming sugar beets. By the 1950s, planting on the Empire Tract involved asparagus; a lawsuit involving 813 acres (329 ha) of asparagus farmland was filed in 1955.

In 1955, levee failures on the Empire Tract and nearby Venice Island would cause both to flood; while 75 men were working on the islands at the time, 73 were successfully evacuated by the Army with amphibious vehicles, and two were picked up in helicopters.

In the late 20th century, natural gas deposits were discovered underneath several Delta islands (such as the Union Island gas field and the Rio Vista gas field). The Union Oil Company of California drilled a 9,400 ft (2,900 m) exploratory well on the Empire Tract in September 1964, but failed to find oil. The next year, the Signal Oil and Gas drilled another well. By 1973, the Union Oil Company was leasing land in the Empire Tract area to extract natural gas.

In 2008, The Modesto Bee published an analysis of the Delta area's subsidence, which gave projections for elevations in the year 2100. The Empire Tract was expected to have the lowest elevation of any island or tract in the Delta, at around 30 ft (9.1 m) below sea level. In 2012, a water treatment plant was finished to divert water from the San Joaquin River for use in farming the Empire Tract; construction had begun in 1996.

=== Ferry and bridge ===
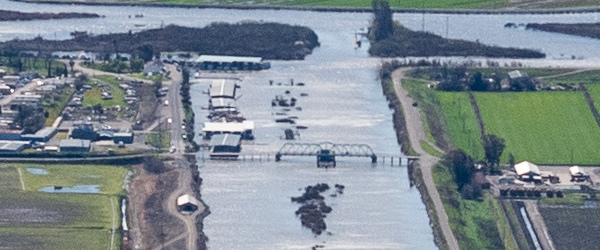
The Eight Mile Road bridge, constructed in 1936 across the Honker Cut

Prior to 1936, travel to and from the island was done by boat; in 1926, a ferry was being operated along the same path later taken by the bridge, at the expense of California Delta Farms Incorporated. At that time, the ferry went from easterly King Island (which was itself in the process of being connected to the mainland via a drawbridge); despite "adverse conditions surrounding the operation of the ferry", it was heavily trafficked, and gravel roads on the Empire Tract itself allowed transportation to and from the ferry slip. The construction of a bridge was recommended at the time by a report submitted to the San Joaquin County Board of Supervisors that year. A proposal was made for the construction of a county-operated ferry at the same location, whose cost was estimated at $1500 ($27,279 in 2025). In 1928, a permit for construction of this ferry was approved by the War Department. Contracts for building the ferry were awarded to Bundeson & Lauritzen, shipbuilders of Pittsburg. In 1935, construction began on a bridge to replace the ferry; work was completed the following year, allowing vehicle access to the island outside of the ferry's operational hours. By 1952, USGS maps of the area show the bridge to King Island and the ferry to Venice Island. In 1954, it was reported that the construction of another bridge, connecting an "Empire Tract" to a "Lower Jones Tract" was proposed (it is not clear which islands were being referred to, as the Lower Jones Tract is some 5 mi (8.0 km) south of the Empire Tract and McDonald Island is between them). As of 1999, regular ferry service operated between the Empire Tract and Venice Island.
