= Acker Island =

Island in California

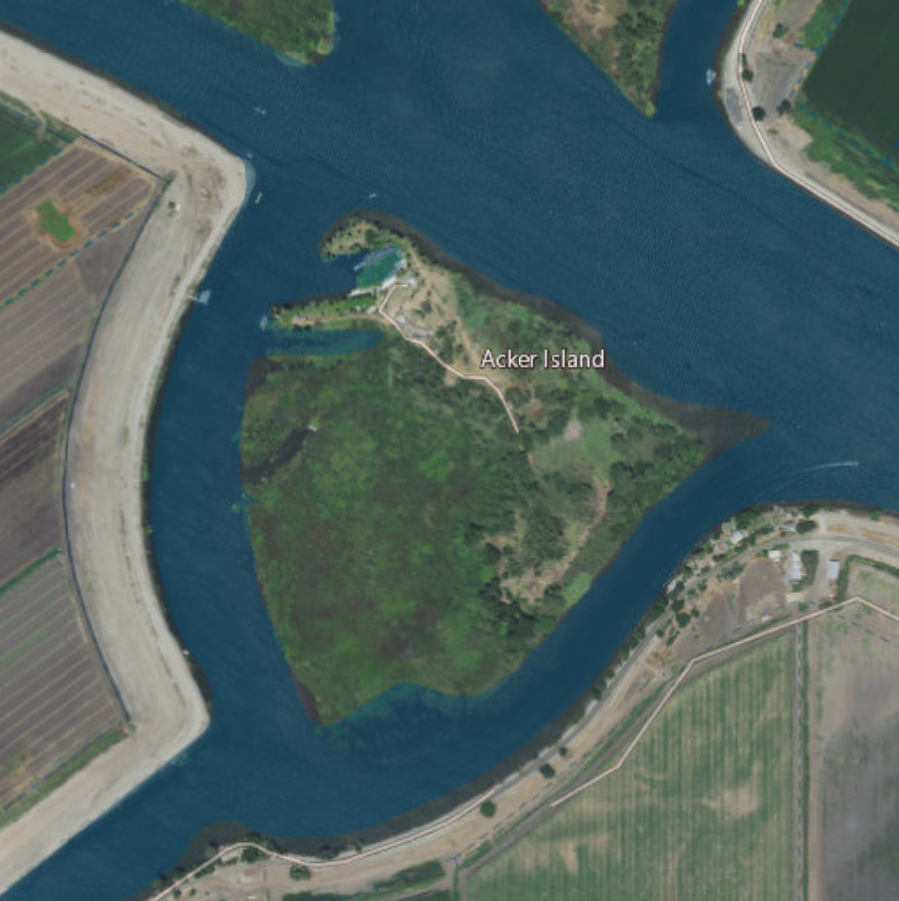
- USGS aerial imagery of Acker Island, with McDonald Island to the west, Spud Island to the northwest, Hog Island to the northeast, Rindge Tract to the east, and Roberts Island to the south.

- Location within Sacramento-San Joaquin River Delta Location within California Location within the United States

Geography
- Location: Northern California
- Coordinates: 37°59′51″N 121°26′56″W
- Adjacent to: Sacramento–San Joaquin River Delta
- Highest elevation: 3 ft (0.9 m)

Administration
- United States
- State: California
- County: San Joaquin

Acker Island (also known as Lost Isle) is a small island in the Sacramento–San Joaquin River Delta. It is part of San Joaquin County, California. Its coordinates are 37°59′51″N 121°26′56″W, and the United States Geological Survey measured its elevation as 3 ft (0.91 m) in 1981. It appears on a 1952 USGS map of the area.
