= Tinsley Island =

Island in California

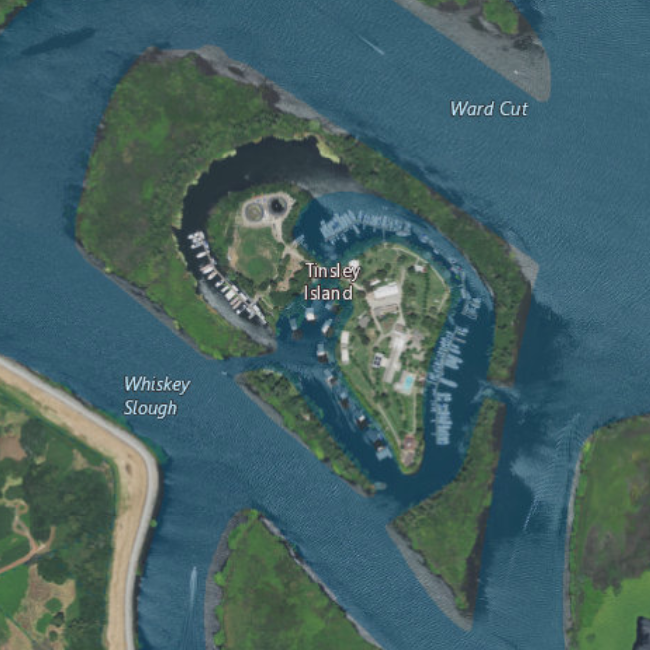
- USGS aerial imagery of Tinsley Island, with Medford Island to its west and Fern Island to its east.

- Location in the Sacramento–San Joaquin River Delta Location in California Location in United States

Geography
- Location: Northern California
- Coordinates: 38°02′16″N 121°29′45″W
- Adjacent to: Sacramento–San Joaquin River Delta
- Highest elevation: 0 ft (0 m)

Administration
- United States
- State: California
- County: San Joaquin

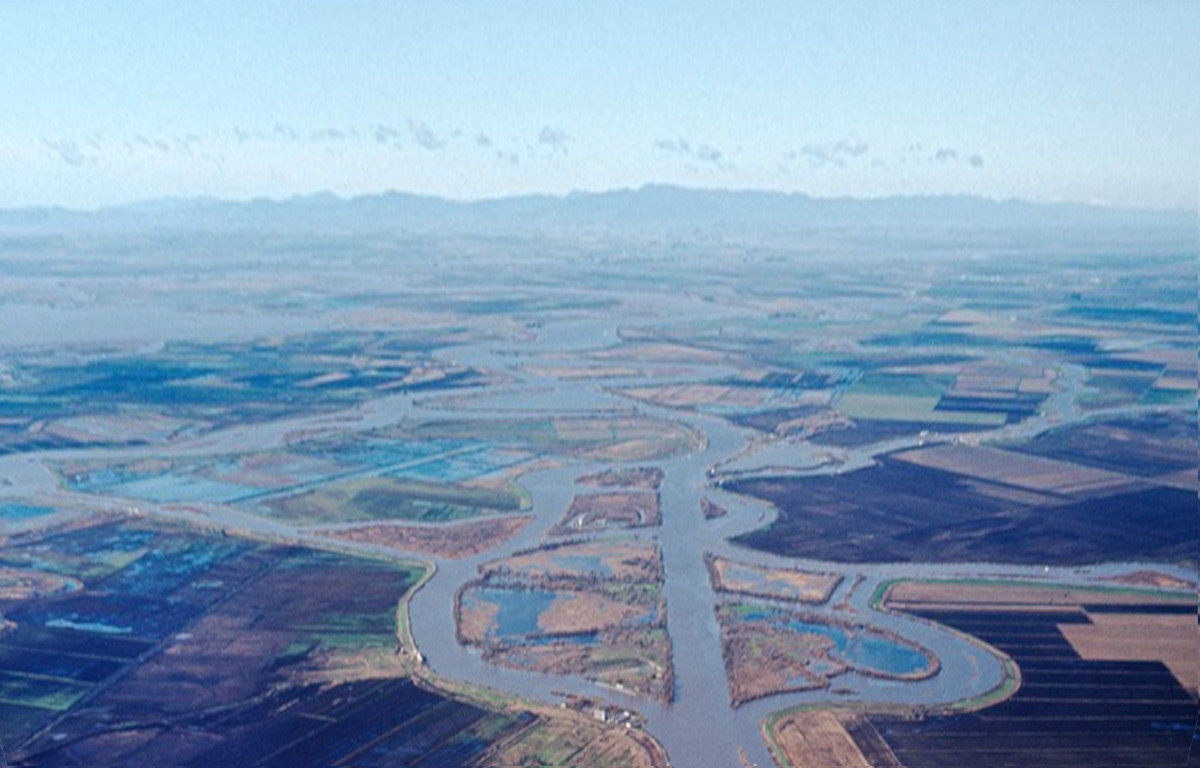
An aerial photo, looking northwest, taken in 1965. Medford Island can be seen to the north and west of Tinsley Island; to its southeast (below it in the photo) are Fern Island, Headreach Island and Tule Island respectively.

Tinsley Island is a small island in the Sacramento–San Joaquin River Delta, in San Joaquin County, California, next to the Stockton Deepwater Shipping Channel. It was created in the 1930s, when dredging to improve the navigability of the San Joaquin River cut it off from Roberts Island. Since 1958, it has been owned by the St. Francis Yacht Club. In 1960, the club transported a lighthouse from San Francisco Bay to serve as its clubhouse, and in the same year began an annual "Stag Cruise"; as of 2024, the club still owns the island and maintains a clubhouse there.

== Geography and Ecology ==
Tinsley Island is part of San Joaquin County, California, and managed by Reclamation District 2108. Its coordinates are 38°02′16″N 121°29′45″W, and the United States Geological Survey (USGS) measured its elevation as 0 ft (0 m) in 1981. Directly to the southeast is an island complex comprising Fern, Headreach and Tule Islands; to its south is McDonald Island, to its west is Medford Island, and to its northwest is Ward Island. Directly to the north is the Ward Cut (a section of the Stockton Deepwater Shipping Channel), and beyond that is the Empire Tract. It is 12 mi (19 km) miles northwest of Stockton. It can be seen from the nearby Empire Tract, although from that elevation the only visible part of the island is "lines of trees or tules belying what may exist beyond".

In 1956, Tinsley Island was surveyed by the San Joaquin County Mosquito Abatement District (along with other islands in the Delta region, including Hog, Spud, Headreach and Fern Islands) as a potential breeding location for mosquitoes.

As of 2000, the largest carp that had ever been caught in the Sacramento–San Joaquin River Delta was 47 lb 8 oz (21.5 kg), on April 17, 1958, made by Dave Cain while trolling in Headreach Cutoff by Tinsley Island.

== History ==
The land that would eventually become Tinsley Island first appears on USGS maps in 1910, as a protrusion on the northern side of Roberts Island. Later, the channel of the San Joaquin River near Tinsley Island was widened and deepened; by March 1934 the work was "more than 50 percent complete". By 1939, it had been separated from Roberts Island by a series of dredger cuts. It was first labeled on a 1952 USGS map of the area.

In 1958, the island was purchased by the St. Francis Yacht Club, an organization started in 1928, for $10,750 ($119,961 in 2025). Their first "cruise" to the island was in 1958, with another in August 1959. At that point, the island was described by the San Francisco Examiner as a "duck pond"; after dredging operations in 1960, it was formed into a fully above-water island with two harbors. Bud Witt was manager of the St. Francis Yacht Club from 1946 to 1960.

In 1960, the club obtained a clubhouse: the Southampton Lighthouse, which had previously been located at Southampton Shoal in San Francisco Bay. The three-story structure, which had been at its previous location since 1906, was planned for removal by the Healy-Tibbets Construction Company; its president, John Marhens, "decided it would be wasteful if not downright disrespectful" to demolish it, and donated it to the yacht club, who paid only $3,000 ($32,649 in 2025) The removal itself involved two marine cranes, and took five hours. It was transported to Tinsley Island on the Crowley Tugboat Company's barge, and was installed there in July.

The club (which was "strictly for members and guests") counted among its members "some of the country's most prominent yachtsmen". In 1964 and 1965, Walt Disney went to Tinsley Island. In 1960, the San Francisco Examiner said the "water skiing, fishing and swimming in the area are excellent". By 1962, one company alone (Stephens Marine of Stockton) had built several unpowered houseboats to be semi-permanently docked at Tinsley Island, where they were attached to water lines and offered "modern conveniences" like thermostat-controlled heating and air conditioning; two of them were more than one story tall. One boat had a hatch that could be opened for fishing in the middle of the living room floor.

In 1963, Tinsley Island had a "swimming pool, bath house, clubhouse, barbecue pits and pleasant company", although one journalist noted that "some mosquitos did a little gripping" during a trip there. In 1964, "considerable improvement" was made to the island's amenities, which were described in 1965 as "the garden spot of the Delta". Despite these improvements, however, in 1965 there was still no telephone on the island — partly due to its remoteness, and partly due to club members who preferred it that way. In 1974, the issuance of revenue bonds was authorized in order to create sanitary facilities for the island. In 1975, the Los Angeles Times said that "the nothin'-but-money crowd lives on Tinsley Island". Residents have received mail by boat since at least the 1970s. As of 2024, the St. Francis Yacht Club still owns and operates the island.

The "Stag Cruise", an annual all-male boating event started in 1958 that "obviously had no feminine hand in its organizing", was described by the San Francisco Examiner as "what might well become the Bohemian Grove of yachting", and was advertised by the club as such:

For medical purposes, a small supply of liquor, consisting of about 50 cases of bourbon, 50 cases of Scotch, 50 cases of gin and other assorted liquors will be on hand for those who may need same. This supply will be served, without charge, at the bar, which will be open at least 16 hours every day.

In September 1960, the cost of tickets was $100 per person ($1,088 in 2025). The sixth annual cruise in 1963 featured "some 300 men, sailing on more than 100 boats". The next cruise, in 1961, featured "some 70 yachts [...] carrying more than 300 persons". The cruise in 1965 was attended by 400 members including John F. Shelley, mayor of San Francisco and former merchant mariner.

In 1966, a training program at Tinsley Island was planned. In it, "one junior from each 20 Bay Area yacht clubs [would] undergo extensive instruction at Tinsley, with former Mallory Cup champion Jimmy DeWitt as chief instructor".

The 1967 cruise had "577 members and guests, on 112 yachts and 24 houseboats"; it featured a "20-piece orchestra and 50 cooks, waiters and bartenders". By that time, the cost was $125 for members ($1,207 in 2025) and $150 for guests ($1,448 in 2025). In 1971, the cruise was described as "a flotilla of yachts and houseboats accompanied by a horde of musicians, cooks and bartenders". By 1973, there were 600 members in attendance, on 100 yachts, and almost 100 bartenders; the Napa Valley Register said that "California men hold the event so dear that judges adjourn trials, physicians postpone surgery, and writers ignore deadlines". The stag cruise continued to run, albeit with less news coverage, through the 1980s. As of 2021, it was still an annual event.
