= Holt =

Holt or holte may refer to:

== Natural world ==
- Holt (den), an otter den
- Holt, an area of woodland

== Places ==
=== Australia ===
- Holt, Australian Capital Territory
- Division of Holt, an electoral district in the Australian House of Representatives in Victoria

=== Canada ===
- Holt, Ontario, a hamlet

=== Denmark ===
- Holte, a town in Rudersdal municipality, Copenhagen county

=== Germany ===
- Holt, Germany, a municipality in Schleswig-Holstein

=== Iceland ===
- Holt (Akureyri), a residence in Sandgerðisbót Akureyri
- Skálholt, the first bishopric of medieval Iceland and the site of a cathedral

=== The Netherlands ===
- Holt, Overijssel, a town in Overijssel

=== Norway ===
- Holt Municipality, a former municipality in the old Aust-Agder county, Norway (now a part of Tvedestrand Municipality)

=== Romania ===
- Holt, a village in Letea Veche Commune, Bacău County

=== United Kingdom ===
- Holt, Dorset
  - Holt Heath, Dorset
- Holt Town, Manchester
- Holt, Norfolk
  - Holt (North Norfolk Railway) railway station
  - Holt railway station, a closed station near Holt, Norfolk
- Holt, Wiltshire
- Holt, Wrexham, Wales
- Holt, Worcestershire

=== United States ===
- Holt, Alabama
- Holt, California
- Holt, Florida
- Holt, Breckinridge County, Kentucky
- Holt, Muhlenberg County, Kentucky
- Holt, Michigan
- Holt, Minnesota
- Holt, Missouri
- Holt, Ohio
- Holt, Wisconsin
- Holt County, Missouri
- Holt County, Nebraska
- Holt Township, Taylor County, Iowa
- Holt Township, Fillmore County, Minnesota
- Holt Township, Marshall County, Minnesota
- Holt Township, Gage County, Nebraska
- Holt Township, Adams County, North Dakota

== People ==
- Holt (surname), including a list of people with the surname
- Victoria Holt, a penname of Eleanor Alice Burford (1906–1993), British romance novelist
- Holt McCallany (born 1963), American actor
- Holt Persinger, American politician elected in 2023

== Fictional characters ==
Holt Richter, from The Cleveland Show

== Companies ==
- Holt & Co., British army agents and private bankers, now part of NatWest Group
- Henry Holt and Company, publishing company
- Holt International Children's Services, U.S.-based adoption company
- Holt Manufacturing Company, progenitor of Caterpillar
- Holt McDougal, publishing company
- Holt Renfrew, Canadian department store
- Lamport and Holt, shipping company

== See also ==
- Holt's (disambiguation)
- Holte (disambiguation)
- Hult (disambiguation)
