= Little Venice Island =

Island in California

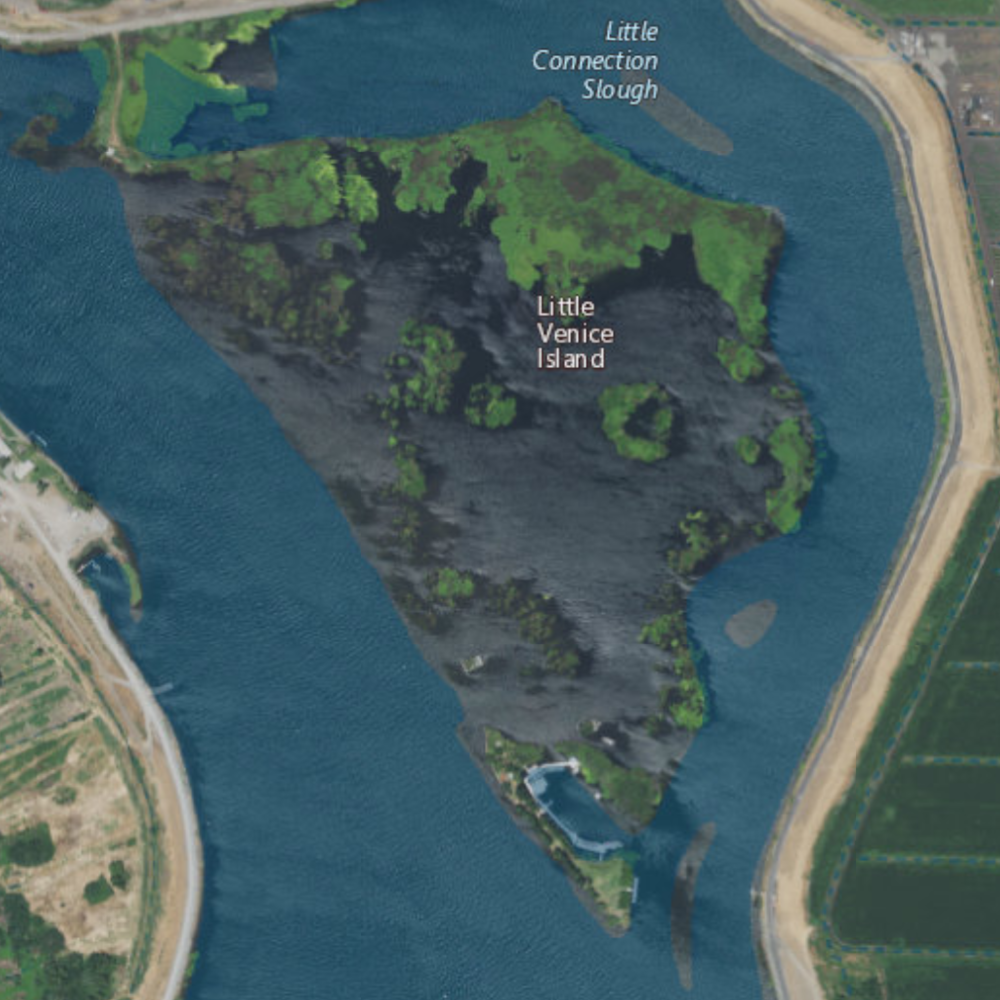
- USGS aerial imagery of Little Venice Island, with Medford Island to the west, Empire Tract to the east, and a bridge connecting to Venice Island on the northwest.

- Location within Sacramento-San Joaquin River Delta Location within California Location within the United States

Geography
- Location: Northern California
- Coordinates: 38°03′02″N 121°30′05″W
- Adjacent to: Sacramento–San Joaquin River Delta
- Highest elevation: 0 ft (0 m)

Administration
- United States
- State: California
- County: San Joaquin

Little Venice Island is a small island in the Sacramento–San Joaquin River Delta. It is part of San Joaquin County, California. Its coordinates are 38°03′02″N 121°30′05″W, and the United States Geological Survey measured its elevation as 0 ft (0 m) in 1981. It appears on a 1952 USGS map of the area.
