= Headreach Island =

Island in California

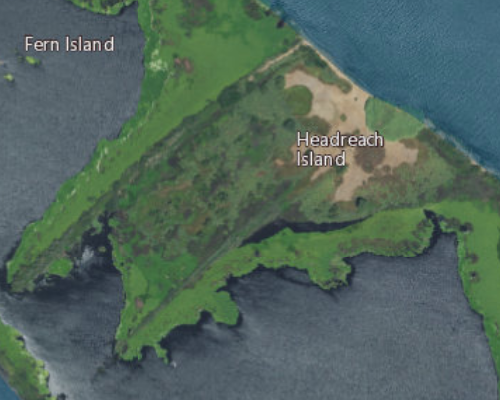
- USGS aerial imagery of Headreach Island, with the Headreach Cutoff to its south, Fern Island to its northwest, and Tule Island to its southeast.

- Location within Sacramento-San Joaquin River Delta Location within California Location within the United States

Geography
- Location: Northern California
- Coordinates: 38°01′55″N 121°29′04″W
- Adjacent to: Sacramento–San Joaquin River Delta
- Highest elevation: 7 ft (2.1 m)

Administration
- United States
- State: California
- County: San Joaquin

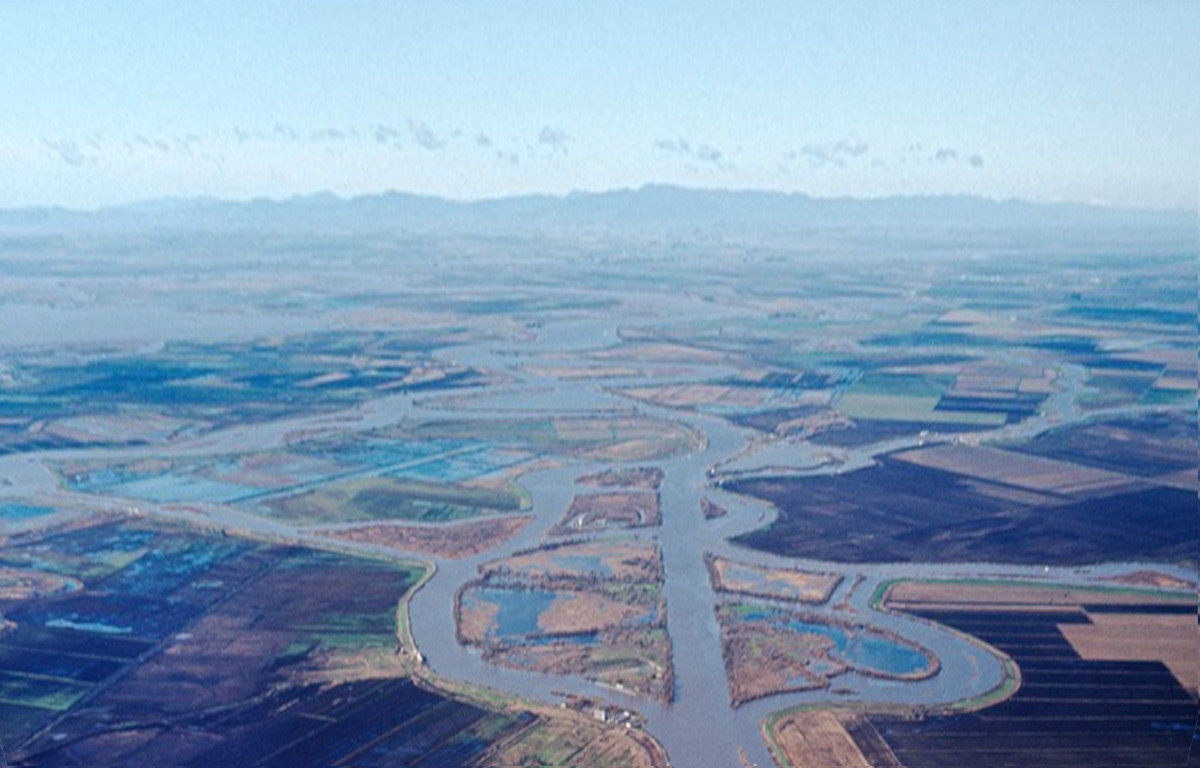
An aerial photo, looking northwest, taken in 1965. Medford Island can be seen to the north and west of Tinsley Island; to its southeast (below it in the photo) are Fern Island, Headreach Island and Tule Island respectively.

Headreach Island is a small island in the Sacramento–San Joaquin River Delta, in northern California. A naturally-formed island existing in a complex with Tule Island to the southeast and Fern Island to the northwest, it was used for farming as late as the 1920s. While several proposals for real estate development on the island were made in the late 20th century, it now consists mostly of marsh and submerged land. Black rails live on the island.

== Geography ==
Headreach Island is part of San Joaquin County. Its coordinates are 38°01′55″N 121°29′04″W; it is part of a complex of three directly-adjacent islands, which also includes Fern Island and Tule Island. The United States Geological Survey measured its elevation as 7 ft (2.1 m) in 1981.

== History ==
Headreach Island is mentioned as early as 1910, when several high school students took a boat there from nearby Acker Island. Headreach island appears in a 1923 report on the hydrography of the San Joaquin River, in which its total area was given as 200 acres (81 ha). Of this, 175 acres (71 ha) were irrigated as farmland, with 25 acres (10 ha) devoted to onions and 150 acres (61 ha) devoted to potatoes.

In the 1930s, the construction of the Stockton Deepwater Shipping Channel involved constructing protective levees around many islands in the Sacramento–San Joaquin River Delta, levees across Headreach Island and Roberts Island were built by the Franks Contracting Company with clamshell dredgers. By June 1931, the levees were 50% completed.

The island appears on a 1952 USGS map of the area. In a 1972 report from the U.S. Army Corps of Engineers, the Fern-Headreach-Tule complex was addressed in a proposal for a project to protect the banks of the Stockton Ship Channel. The report noted that (in contrast to other islands in the area) the complex was "not reclaimed agricultural land, but an area of near-natural state". At the time, the complex contained "virtually no permanent residential developments". A 1974 report, by the same agency, said that Headreach Island had been used in the past for the disposal of dredging spoils. The 1974 report also specified that around 12 acres (4.9 ha) of Headreach Island was covered with vegetation (shrubs and grass), and that the remainder of the island was either marshland or totally submerged.

In 1978, the island was owned by the Port of Stockton. The Modesto Bee reported in January that a $5 to $6 million development (equivalent to $24.7 million to $29.6 million in 2025) on Headreach Island and nearby Tule Island had been proposed (including a two-story marina, a restaurant, and bar). In May, the Bee reported that the "major recreational area" had been approved on Headreach Island by the San Joaquin County Board of Supervisors.

In 1982, a feasibility report on environmental enhancement measures for the area noted that the island complex was a habitat for the black rail and other waterfowl. A proposal was made, in that document, to construct a "boater destination site" at Headreach Island consisting of a day-use dock as well as two chemical toilets.
