= Tule Island =

Island in California

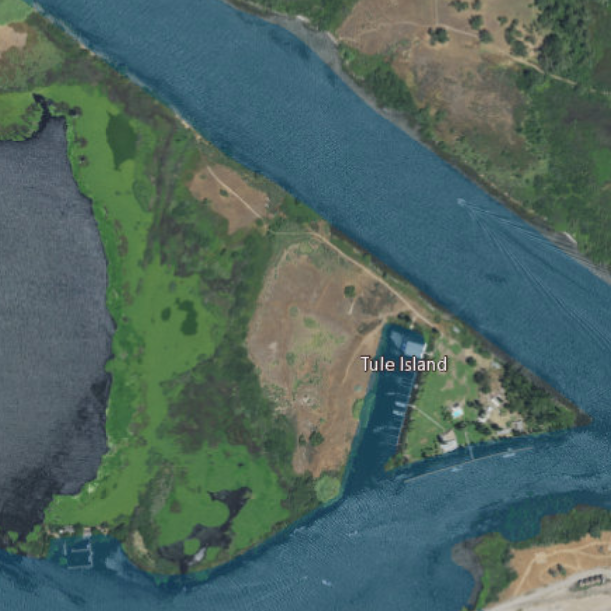
- USGS aerial imagery of Tule Island, with Headreach Island to its northwest and McDonald Island to its southeast

- Location within Sacramento-San Joaquin River Delta Location within California Location within the United States

Geography
- Location: Northern California
- Coordinates: 38°01′41″N 121°28′39″W
- Adjacent to: Sacramento–San Joaquin River Delta
- Highest elevation: 33 ft (10.1 m)

Administration
- United States
- State: California
- County: San Joaquin

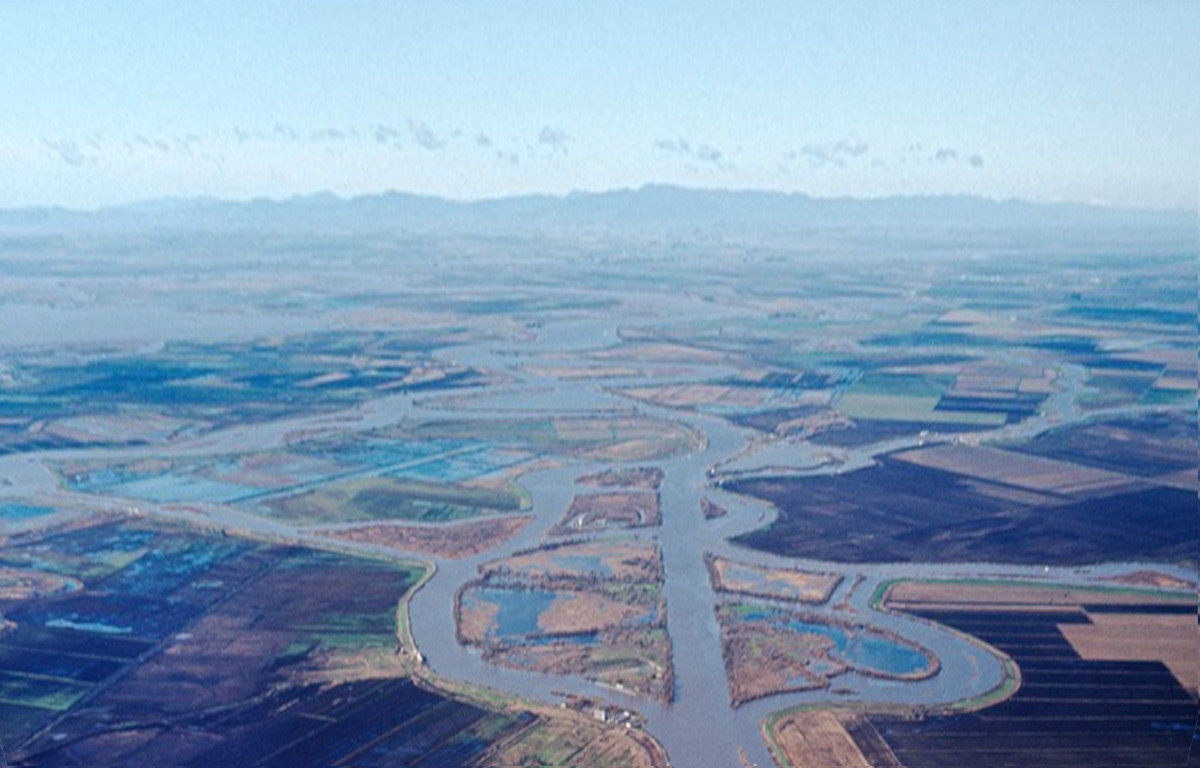
An aerial photo, looking northwest, taken in 1965. Medford Island can be seen to the north and west of Tinsley Island; to its southeast (below it in the photo) are Fern Island, Headreach Island and Tule Island respectively.

Tule Island is a small island in the Sacramento–San Joaquin River Delta, which exists as part of a complex of islands including directly-adjacent Fern Island and Headreach Island. It is a naturally-formed island, which was used in the early 20th century to farm potatoes, but now consists mostly of marsh. It is currently a habitat for waterfowl and is used as a fishing spot.

== Geography ==
Tule Island's coordinates are 38°01′41″N 121°28′39″W; it is part of San Joaquin County, California. It is one of three directly-adjacent islands: to its north is Headreach Island, and beyond that is Fern Island. The three are sometimes referred to as the Fern-Headreach-Tule complex. In a 1923 report on the hydrography of the San Joaquin River, its total area was given as 100 acres (40 ha). It appears on a 1952 United States Geological Survey (USGS) map of the area, and the USGS gave its elevation as 33 ft (10 m) in 1981.

== History ==
In 1923, 85 acres (34 ha) out of the island's total area of 100 acres (40 ha) was devoted to potato farming. Since then, its use for agriculture diminished; in November 1929, the City of Stockton put the island up for public auction. By the mid-20th century, it became known as a fishing location. Parts of the musical Porgy and Bess were filmed in 1958 on Tule Island and nearby Venice Island.

In a 1972 report from the U.S. Army Corps of Engineers, the Fern-Headreach-Tule complex was addressed in a proposal for a project to protect the banks of the Stockton Ship Channel. The report noted that (in contrast to other islands in the area) the complex was "not reclaimed agricultural land, but an area of near-natural state". At the time, the complex contained "virtually no permanent residential developments", but it was noted that a "small private boat club" was located on the east side of Tule Island. The Modesto Bee reported in January 1978 that a $5 – $6 million development (equivalent to $24.7 million – $29.6 million in 2025) on Tule Island (and nearby Headreach Island) had been proposed, including a two-story marina, a restaurant, and bar. In 1984, the island was receiving regular postal service, and in 1989, it was home to the Delta Yacht Club.

A 1982 feasibility report on environmental enhancement measures for the area suggested a government purchase of Tule Island for preservation as a wildlife habitat, noting that the island complex was a habitat for the black rail and other waterfowl.
