= General Holt (disambiguation) =

Joseph Holt (1807–1894) was a Union Army brigadier general. General Holt may also refer to:

- Cameron Holt (fl. 1990s–2020s), U.S. Air Force major general
- Felton Holt (1886–1931), Royal Air Force brigadier general
- Maurice Holt (1862–1954), British Army major general
- William G. Holt (fl. 1990s–2020s), U.S. Air Force major general
