= Timothy Holt =

Timothy or Tim Holt may refer to:

- Timothy Holt (1836–1912), American pioneer, settled village of Holts Summit, Missouri
- Tim Holt (1919–1973), American actor
- Tim Holt (statistician) (1943–2022), British statistician
- Tim Holt (American football) (born 1972), American football coach

== See also ==
- Holt (surname)
