= Alfred Holt (disambiguation) =

Alfred Holt may refer to the following people:

- Alfred Holt (1829–1911), British engineer, ship owner and merchant
- Alfred Holt (American football) (1866–1901), American football coach and academic
- Alfred Holt (cricketer) (1863–1942), English first-class cricketer
- Alfred Holt Colquitt (1824–1894), American lawyer, preacher, soldier, and politician
- Alfred Holt Stone (1870–1955), American writer, politician, and tax commissioner
