= Ward Island =

Ward Island may refer to:

- Mākaro/Ward Island, in Wellington Harbour, New Zealand
- Ward Island (Texas), in Corpus Christi
- Ward Island (California), an island in the Sacramento–San Joaquin River Delta

== See also ==
- Wards Island, in New York

- Wards Island Bridge, in New York

- Ward Hunt Island, in the Canadian Arctic
- Ward Islands (South Australia)
- Ward's Island - common name for the eastern end of Centre Island in Toronto
