= McDonald Island =

McDonald Island or MacDonald Island may refer to

- McDonald Islands, part of Heard Island and McDonald Islands group, a remote territory administered by Australia in the southern Indian Ocean
- McDonald Island (California), in San Joaquin County on the San Joaquin River
- McDonald Island (Ontario), in the St. Lawrence River
- MacDonald Island, in British Columbia
- MacDonald Island Park, 2014 arena for The National curling tournament in Fort McMurray, Alberta, Canada
