= Justice Holt =

Justice Holt may refer to:

- Andrew Holt (judge) (1855–1948), associate justice of the Minnesota Supreme Court
- Homer A. Holt (justice) (1831–1898), associate justice of the Supreme Court of Appeals of West Virginia
- Henry W. Holt (1864–1947), associate justice and chief justice of the Supreme Court of Virginia
- J. Frank Holt (1910–1983), associate justice of the Arkansas Supreme Court
- J. Seaborn Holt (1884–1963), associate justice of the Arkansas Supreme Court
- Jack Holt Jr. (born 1929), chief justice of the Arkansas Supreme Court
- John Holt (Lord Chief Justice) (1642–1710), Lord Chief Justice of England
- Ryves Holt (1696–1763), associate justice and chief justice of the Delaware Supreme Court
- William H. Holt (1842–1919), associate justice and chief justice of the Kentucky Court of Errors and Appeals

== See also ==
- Judge Holt (disambiguation)
