= Charles F. McKenna =

American judge (1844–1922)

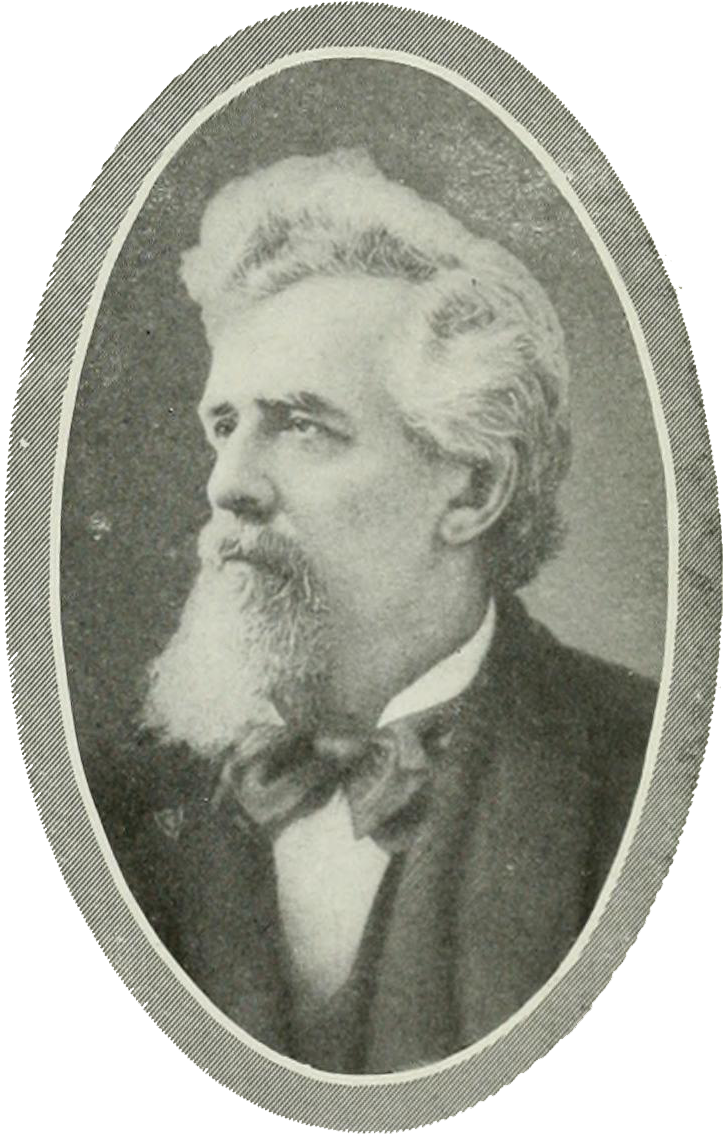
- McKenna in 1913

Personal details
- Born: Charles Francis McKenna; October 1, 1844; Pittsburgh, Pennsylvania, U.S.
- Died: December 3, 1922 (aged 78); Pittsburgh, Pennsylvania, U.S.
- Occupation: Lawyer; judge

Charles Francis McKenna (October 1, 1844 – December 3, 1922) was a United States district judge for the United States District Court for the District of Puerto Rico.

== Biography ==
McKenna was born on October 1, 1844, in Pittsburgh, Pennsylvania, the son of James McKenna (1800 – 1846) and Ann Mullen McKenna (1801 – 1884). His father died before Charles was one year old. Charles had four brothers, James, Edward M., Patrick A, and Bernard, and one sister, Catherine. At 14, he became the apprentice of a lithographer which will lead him to draw precise recollections of his war stories.

Charles enlisted in the Union Army in July 1862 at the age of 18. He joined Company E 155th Regiment, Pennsylvania Volunteers. After less than a month of training, he started to participate in the Civil War battles of Antietam, Fredericksburg, Chancellorsville, Gettysburg, Cold Harbor, Petersburg and Appomattox.

During long period of inactivity, usually in winter camp, he studied under Sergeant George P. Fulton who subsequently became principal of Highland Schools in Pennsylvania.

In 1865, after the war, Charles was admitted to the bar and practiced for several years with James I. Kuhn.

After he was judge of the Supreme Court of Pennsylvania, McKenna was a judge of the United States District Court for the District of Puerto Rico from 1904 to 1906. He was appointed to that office by President Theodore Roosevelt. His first move was to set up an Elks lodge. He could not bear the weather there and returned to Pittsburgh 2 1/2 years later.

Afterwards, he practiced law with his nephews, E.J. and J. Frank McKenna, and later became one of the first judges of the County Court of Allegheny County. He was active in Veterans' affairs and edited a volume on the Civil War entitled, "Under the Maltese Cross." He presided the Gettysburg Battlefield commission.

He died on December 3, 1922, in Pittsburgh.

== Personal life ==
Charles F. McKenna married Miss Virginia White on 1 October 1872. The couple never had children.

Preceded by William H. Holt	Judge, United States District Court for the District of Puerto Rico; 1904–1906	Succeeded by John J. Jenkins
