= Holt's =

Holt's may refer to:

- Holt's Military Banking, a trading name of The Royal Bank of Scotland, part of the NatWest Group
- Holt's Wharf, a former railway and freight hub in Hong Kong
- Holt Renfrew, a Canadian department store chain, owned by Selfridges Group

== See also ==
- Holt (disambiguation)
