= Hult =

Hult is the Swedish spelling variant of holt and may refer to:

== Education ==
- Hult International Business School, a global business school with locations in Boston, San Francisco, London, Dubai, Shanghai,& New York
  - Hult Ashridge Executive Education, Hult Intl. Business School's executive education program
  - Hult Prize, the world's largest student competition for social good, founded by Bertil Hult and hosted by the Hult Intl. Business School

== Organizations ==
- Hult Center for the Performing Arts, Oregon
- Hult Healey, a maker of automotive kits

== Surname ==
- Hult (surname)

== Places ==
- Hult, Sweden, a village in Eksjö Municipality

== See also ==
- Holt (disambiguation)
- Holte (disambiguation)
