= Andrew Holt =

Andy or Andrew Holt may refer to:

- Andrew D. Holt (1904–1987), president of the University of Tennessee
- Andy Holt (1910s and 1920s footballer), English footballer
- Andy Holt (footballer, born 1978), English footballer
- Andy Holt (Hollyoaks), fictional character in the Channel 4 British television soap opera Hollyoaks
- Andrew Holt (judge) (1855–1948), American jurist
- Andy Holt (politician) (born 1981), politician in the Tennessee House of Representatives
- Andy Holt (businessman), British businessman and owner of Accrington Stanley FC
