= William Holt =

William Holt may refer to:

== Politicians ==
- William Holt (fl.1397), MP for Launceston
- William Holt (died 1436), MP for Warwickshire
- William Holt (mayor) (1737–1791), mayor of Williamsburg, Virginia
- William Holte or Holt, MP for Clitheroe and Preston

== Others ==
- William Holt (Jesuit) (1545–1599), rector of English College
- William Holt (writer) (1897–1977), English writer, artist and traveller
- Lt. William Holt, the main character in Medal of Honor: European Assault
- William Holt (cricketer) (1935–2024), former New Zealand cricketer
- William H. Holt (1842–1919), American judge
- Will Holt (1929–2015), writer and lyricist
- Willy Holt (1921–2007), American production designer
- William Mack Holt (1917–1942), American Navy sailor and naval aviator
