= Judge Holt =

Judge Holt may refer to:

- George Chandler Holt (1843–1931), judge of the United States District Court for the Southern District of New York
- William H. Holt (1842–1919), judge of the United States District Court for the District of Puerto Rico

== See also ==
- Ryan T. Holte (born 1983), judge of the United States Court of Federal Claims
- Justice Holt (disambiguation)
