= Hog Island (San Joaquin County) =

Island in California

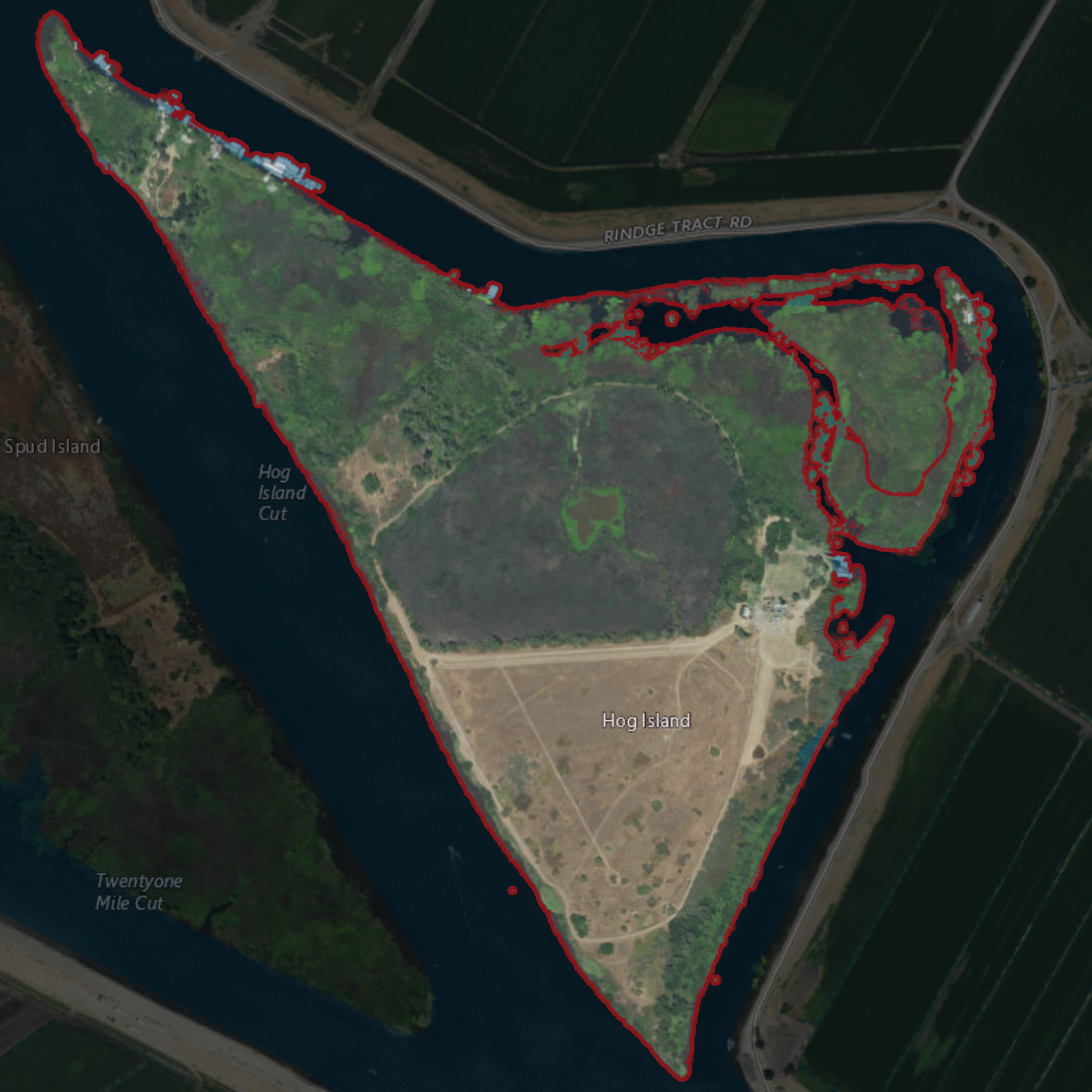
- USGS aerial imagery of Hog Island

- Location within Sacramento-San Joaquin River Delta Location within California Location within the United States

Geography
- Location: Northern California
- Coordinates: 38°00′15″N 121°26′53″W
- Adjacent to: Sacramento–San Joaquin River Delta
- Highest elevation: 13 ft (4 m)

Administration
- United States
- State: California
- County: San Joaquin

Hog Island is an island in the San Joaquin River, and is one of many islands which constitute the Sacramento–San Joaquin River Delta. It was used for agriculture in the early 20th century, but has now mostly become marsh or submerged land; it remains a spot for fishing, particularly channel and blue catfish.

== Geography ==
Hog Island is located in San Joaquin County, California, and is not managed by any reclamation district. Hog Island was separated from Spud Island to its southwest by the dredging of the Hog Island Cut; the two islands are in the San Joaquin River, at a point where McDonald Island lies to the west of the river and Rindge Tract to its east. The United States Geological Survey (USGS) gives its elevation as 13 ft (4.0 m).

== History ==
The existence of a "Hog Island" in the Sacramento–San Joaquin River Delta is difficult to determine, since there are multiple islands with the same name. Even within northern California, there exists a Hog Island approximately 100 miles (160 km) northwest in Tomales Bay (referenced by that name as early as 1916) as well as a Hog Island 60 miles (97 km) northwest in the Petaluma River (referenced as early as 1914). Nevertheless, references to a Hog Island in the Delta area can be found as early as 1880, and it first appears labeled on a 1910 USGS map surveyed in 1907 to 1908. However, the orientation of the islands was different on the 1910 map, in which they are separated by the Deadman Reach segment of the San Joaquin River (running north to south).

In the early 20th century, the island was used for agriculture; references to crops being grown on Hog Island appear in 1914, and a 1923 survey by the California Department of Water Rights gave its area as 100 acres (40 ha), with 80 acres (32 ha) irrigated for crops, all of which was devoted to the cultivation of wheat.

In June 1931, Hog and Spud Islands were mentioned in an engineering report on dredging in the Delta; the Hog Island Cut was being dredged to separate them, and levees were in the process of being constructed on both sides of the new cut with clamshell dredgers. From then onward, Hog Island appears on maps in its current shape. Over time, it began to subside; a 1939 USGS map shows it with a small slough in its interior on the northwest side, and a 1952 map shows it with substantial portions of its northern half as marshland. In 1974, a report from the United States Army Corps of Engineers noted that dredging spoils had been deposited on the island in the past, and that approximately 15 acres (6.1 ha) of the island's southern end was grassland (with the remainder of it being either marsh or submerged). This agrees with the state of the island as shown in a 1978 USGS map.

The owners of Hog and Spud Islands spent many years attempting to open them to the public for recreational use; while plans were approved by the San Joaquin County Board of Supervisors in 2007, additional agencies required additional documents. In June 2011, the Modesto Bee reported that plans to build a family science camp were "moving forward with the blessing of the Army Corps of Engineers", and that new docks would be constructed later that summer.

Hog Island is known as a fishing spot in the Delta, where halibut and striped bass have been caught.
