= Ward Island (California) =

Island in California

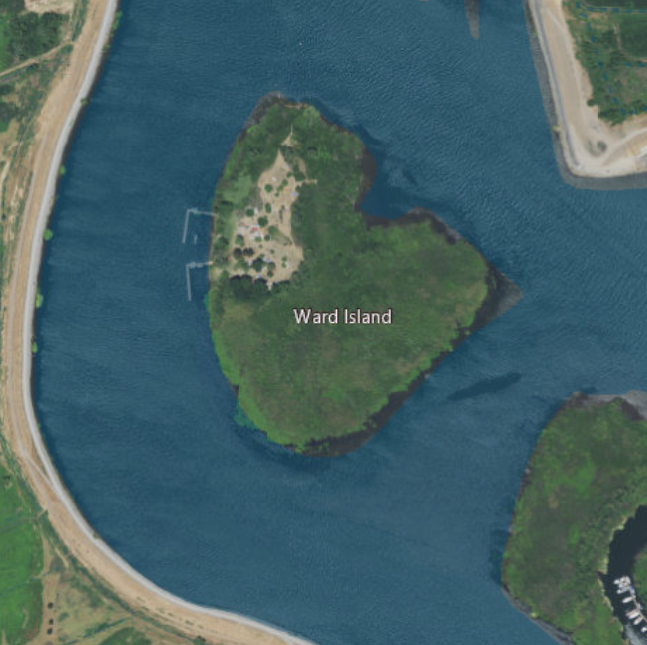
- USGS aerial imagery of Ward Island, with Medford Island to its west, Empire Tract to its northeast, and Tinsley Island to its southeast.

- Location within Sacramento-San Joaquin River Delta Location within California Location within the United States

Geography
- Location: Northern California
- Coordinates: 38°02′30″N 121°30′09″W
- Adjacent to: Sacramento–San Joaquin River Delta
- Highest elevation: 7 ft (2.1 m)

Administration
- United States
- State: California
- County: San Joaquin

Ward Island (also known as Wards Island) is a small island in the Sacramento–San Joaquin River Delta. It is part of San Joaquin County, California. Its coordinates are 38°02′30″N 121°30′09″W, and the United States Geological Survey measured its elevation as 7 ft (2.1 m) in 1981. It appears on a 1952 USGS map of the area.
