= Holte (disambiguation) =

Holte is a district on the outskirts of Copenhagen, Denmark.

Holte may also refer to:

- Holte (Kristiansand), a neighbourhood in the city of Kristiansand, Norway
- Holte railway station, near Copenhagen
- Holte (surname)
- Holte baronets, an extinct title in the Baronetage of England
- Holte School, Birmingham, England, a mixed secondary school

== See also ==
- Holt (disambiguation)
- Hult (disambiguation)
