= Spud Island =

Island in California

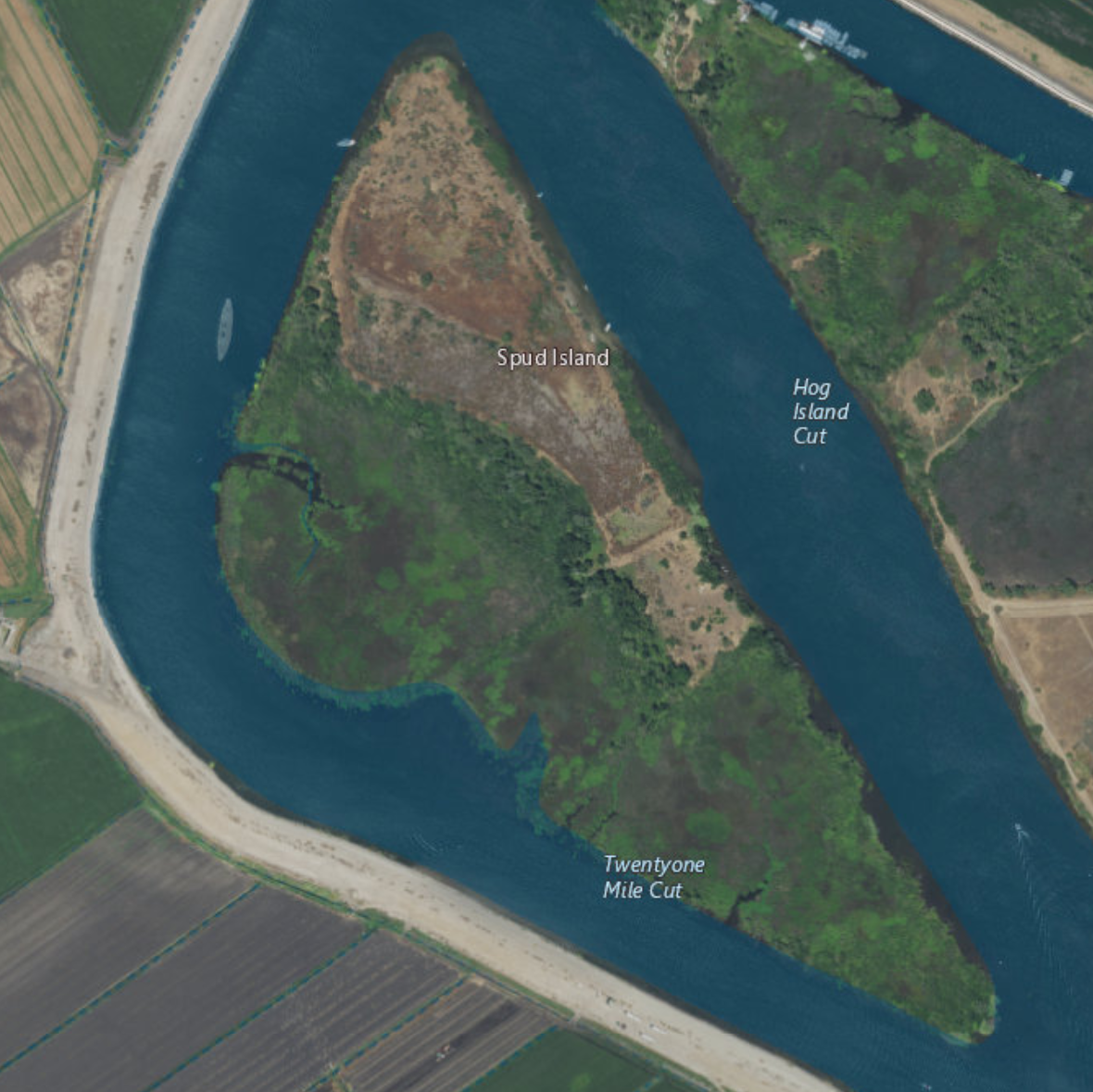
- USGS aerial imagery of Spud Island in the San Joaquin River, with McDonald Island to its west, Hog Island to its east, and Rindge Tract past Hog Island.

- Location within Sacramento-San Joaquin River Delta Location within California Location within the United States

Geography
- Location: Northern California
- Coordinates: 38°00′27″N 121°27′26″W
- Adjacent to: Sacramento–San Joaquin River Delta
- Highest elevation: 13 ft (4 m)

Administration
- United States
- State: California
- County: San Joaquin

Spud Island is a small island of the San Joaquin River, located in the Sacramento–San Joaquin River Delta in northern California. It was once used to farm onions; while it is no longer used for agriculture, it remains inhabited. In the late 20th century it was the site of a county park, which offered camping, fishing and swimming amenities free of charge.

== Geography ==
Spud Island's coordinates are 38°00′27″N 121°27′26″W, and the United States Geological Survey (USGS) measured its elevation as 13 ft (4.0 m) in 1981. It is in the San Joaquin River in San Joaquin County, California, at a point where McDonald Island lies to the west of the river and Rindge Tract to the east. Spud Island was separated from the nearby Hog Island by the dredging of the Hog Island Cut.

== History ==
Islands in the location currently constituting Spud Island and Hog Island are shown on maps as early as the 1900s. However, the orientation of the islands was different, and they were separated by the Deadman Reach segment of the San Joaquin River (which ran north to south).

A 1923 survey by the California Department of Water Rights gave the area of Spud Island as 100 acres (40 ha), with 70 acres (28 ha) devoted to the cultivation of onions. The city of Stockton purchased Spud Island from the Rindge Land & Navigation Company in 1928 for a sum of $15,000 (equivalent to $281,000 in 2025).

In June 1931, Hog and Spud Islands were mentioned in an engineering report on dredging in the Delta; the Hog Island Cut was being dredged to separate them, and levees were in the process of being constructed on both sides of the new cut with clamshell dredgers. The winning bids for the two contracts on Spud Island were made by the Franks Contracting Company, of San Francisco, and California Delta Farms Incorporated, of Stockton. The excavation of the cut, and the construction of the levees, involved moving over one million cu yd (760,000 m^{3}) of dirt; by November, it was 85% complete. By 1939, the islands appeared on a USGS map in their current orientation, divided by the Hog Island Cut running from southeast to northwest. Spud Island was once used for agriculture; after the 1940s, however, it would begin to sit "basically untouched". In 1952, USGS maps show Spud Island as having large amounts of marsh and submerged land.

By 1974, the entirety of Spud Island (with an area given as 60 acres (24 ha)) was owned by the Port of Stockton, and parts of the island had been used for disposal of dredging spoils; a report from the United States Army Corps of Engineers noted that 20 acres (8.1 ha) was "grass-shrub land" at the northern tip, and the remainder was marsh. In 1986, residents of Spud Island were receiving mail through the United States Postal Service, from one of 68 mail carriers in the United States who delivered by boat. In 1997, a boat ran aground on Spud Island, killing one person and injuring another.

== Recreation ==
Since the decline of agriculture on the island, various entities have attempted to make Spud Island available for use as a recreation area, with varying degrees of success. In 1974, the Port of Stockton was leasing South Spud Island to San Joaquin County, who made it available for public use. The site was furnished with picnic tables, trash containers, and one barbecue area, but no toilets. In that same year, the Fremont Argus quoted a Coast Guard Auxiliary serviceman as saying that there was a "good swimming beach", overnight camping, and "pretty good catfishing" on Spud Island (which, as a county park, was free to use). In 1981, the California Department of Boating and Waterways was cited as giving "high priority" to the development of Spud Island as a recreational area for boaters. In 2007, the owners of Hog and Spud Islands were attempting to open them to the public for recreational use.
