= King Island (California) =

Island in California, United States

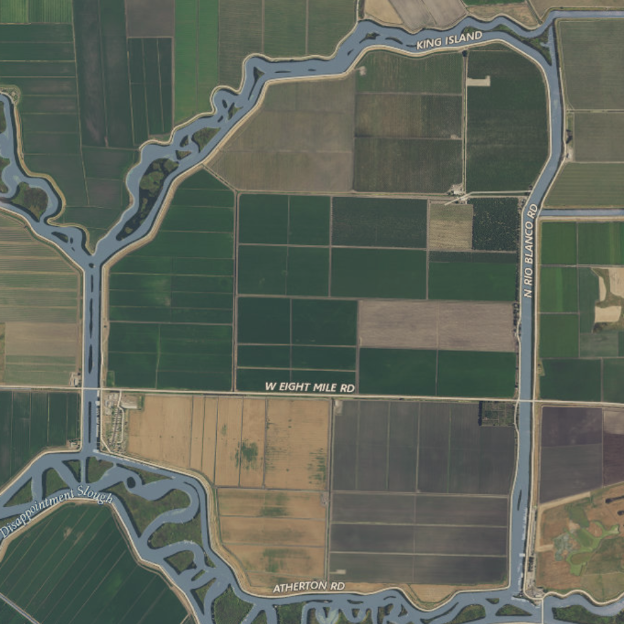

- Location within Sacramento-San Joaquin River Delta Location within California Location within the United States

Geography
- Location: Northern California
- Coordinates: 38.065476°N 121.436617°W
- Adjacent to: Sacramento-San Joaquin River Delta
- Area: 3,200 acres (1,300 ha)

Administration
- United States
- State: California
- County: San Joaquin

King Island is an island in the north Sacramento-San Joaquin River Delta, twenty kilometres east of Antioch, and twenty kilometres west of Stockton. The 1,300 ha (3,200-acre) island is bounded on the north by White Slough, on the east by Bishop Cut, on the south by Disappointment Slough, and on the west, Honker Cut. It is in San Joaquin County, and managed by Reclamation District 2044. It appears on a 1952 United States Geological Survey map of the area.

== See also ==
- List of islands of California
