= Cameron Holt =

U.S. Air Force general

Cameron G. Holt
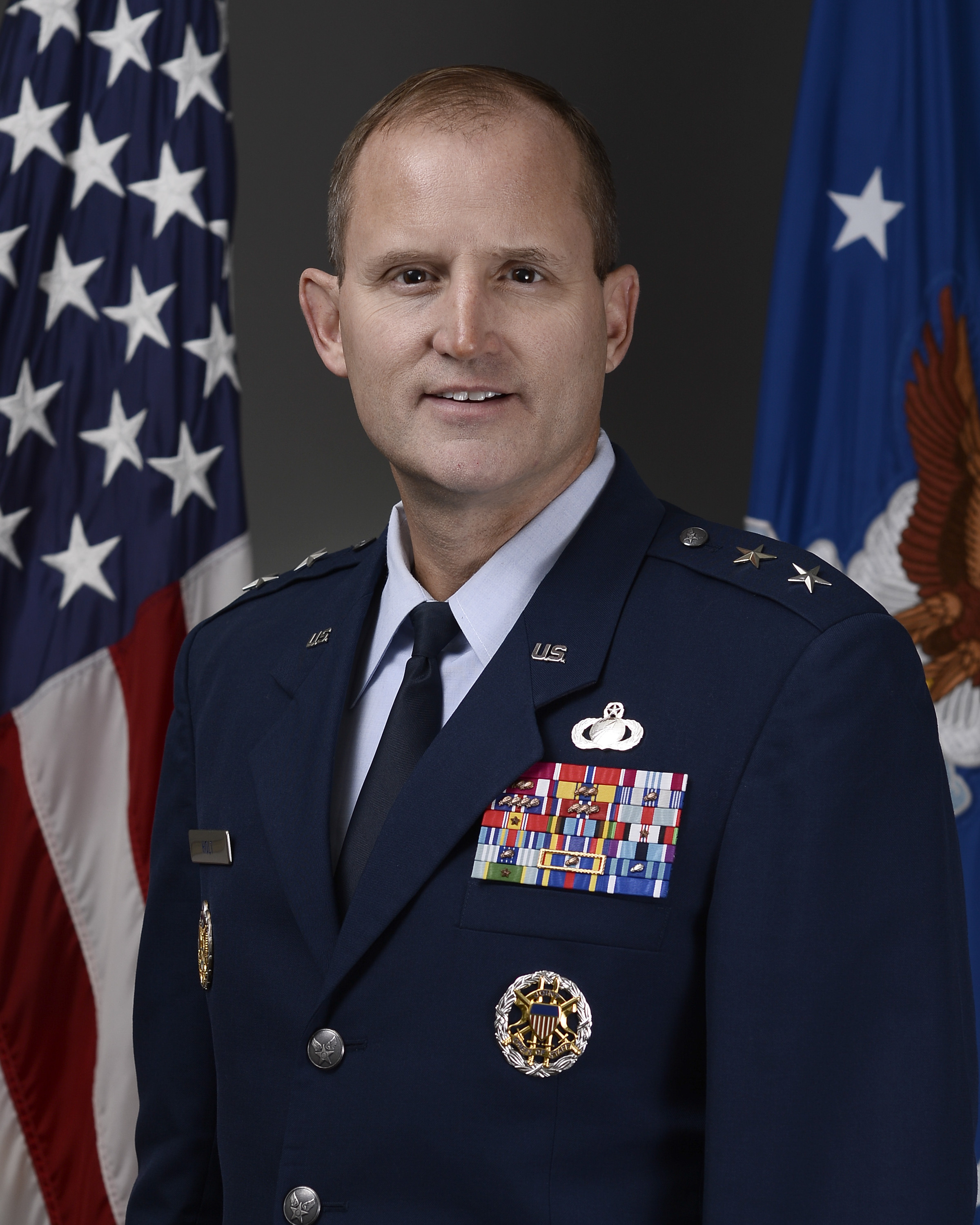
- Military career
- Allegiance: United States
- Branch: United States Air Force
- Service years: 1990–2022
- Rank: Major General
- Commands: Air Force Installation Contracting Agency; Defense Contract Management- Afghanistan; 14th Contracting Squadron
- Conflicts: War in Afghanistan
- Awards: Legion of Merit; Bronze Star Medal

Cameron G. Holt is a retired United States Air Force major general who last served as the deputy assistant secretary for contracting of the United States Air Force. Previously, he was the commander of the Air Force Installation Contracting Agency.

Military offices
Preceded by Mark Baird	Commander of the Air Force Installation Contracting Agency; 2015–2018	Succeeded by Alice Treviño
Preceded by Casey D. Blake	Deputy Assistant Secretary for Contracting of the Assistant Secretary of the Air Force for Acquisition, Technology, & Logistics; 2018–2022	Succeeded by Alice W. Treviño
