= Holt, Ohio =

- Unincorporated community
- Location within Ohio
- Coordinates: 40°30′44″N 80°45′06″W
- Country: United States
- State: Ohio
- Counties: Jefferson
- Elevation: 810 ft (250 m)
- Time zone: UTC-5 (Eastern (EST))
  - Summer (DST): UTC-4 (EDT)
- ZIP code: 43932
- Area code: 740
- GNIS feature ID: 1048848

Holt is an unincorporated community in Ross Township, Jefferson County, Ohio, United States. It is located about 3 miles (4.8 km) west of New Somerset at the intersection of County Highway 53 and Township Road 218.

The Mitchell's Salt Works Post Office was established on July 20, 1848. The name was changed to Holt Post Office on May 9, 1892, and the branch was discontinued on November 30, 1907. Mail service is now handled through the Hammondsville branch.
