= Hult (surname) =

Hult is a Swedish surname.

== Geographical distribution ==
As of 2014, 60.8% of all known bearers of the surname Hult were residents of Sweden (frequency 1:3,000), 26.2% of the United States (1:254,941), 4.6% of Finland (1:22,164), 4.2% of Norway (1:22,456), 1.4% of Denmark (1:72,366) and 1.1% of Canada (1:645,579).

In Sweden, the frequency of the surname was higher than national average (1:3,000) in the following counties:

1. Värmland County (1:1,211)
2. Kalmar County (1:1,555)
3. Kronoberg County (1:1,569)
4. Gotland County (1:1,828)
5. Jönköping County (1:1,849)
6. Västra Götaland County (1:2,464)
7. Blekinge County (1:2,609)
8. Dalarna County (1:2,665)
9. Södermanland County (1:2,792)
10. Skåne County (1:2,897)

In Finland, the frequency of the surname was higher than national average (1:22,164) in the following regions:

1. Central Finland (1:8,638)
2. Uusimaa (1:13,561)
3. Kymenlaakso (1:14,242)
4. Pirkanmaa (1:14,987)
5. Tavastia Proper (1:15,195)
6. Ostrobothnia (1:17,380)
7. South Karelia (1:18,028)

In Norway, the frequency of the surname was higher than national average (1:22,456) only in one region: Western Norway (1:10,681).

== Notable people ==
- Bengt Hult (1917–2008), Swedish jurist, President of the Supreme Court of Sweden from 1979 to 1984
- Bertil Hult (born 1941), Swedish businessman; Hult International Business School is named for him
- Emma Hult (born 1988), Swedish politician
- Karl Hult (born 1944), Swedish biochemist and researcher
- Karl-Erik Hult (1936–2010), Swedish footballer and manager
- Nils Hult (born 1939), commissioner who helped create the Hult Center for the Performing Arts, in Eugene, Oregon, US
- Ragnar Hult (1857–1899), Finnish botanist and plant geographer
- Tina Signesdottir Hult (born 1982), Norwegian photographer
- Barbara Hult Lekberg (1925–2018), American metal sculptor

== See also ==
- Johan Hultin (born 1924), Swedish-American pathologist
