= Robert Holt =

Robert or Bob Holt may refer to:

- Robert Holt (politician) (1913–1985), Australian politician
- Robert Holt (American football) (born 1959), American football player
- Robert Holt (timber merchant) (1833–1909), New Zealand builder, undertaker, timber merchant and sawmiller
- Robert Andrew Holt (born 1968), genomic scientist and immunogeneticist
- Robert Durning Holt (1832–1908), English cotton-broker and mayor of Liverpool
- Robert R. Holt (1917–2024), American psychologist
- Bob Holt (actor) (1928–1985), American actor
- Bob Holt (athlete) (born 1944), English distance runner
- Bob Holt (fiddler) (1930–2004), American fiddler

== See also ==
- Robert Holte (died 1679), of the Holte baronets
