= Steve Holt =

Steve Holt may refer to:

- Steve Holt (American musician), guitarist for the band 36 Crazyfists
- Steve Holt (Canadian musician) (born 1954), Canadian jazz pianist
- Steve Holt (Arrested Development), a television character
