= Karl Hult =

Swedish biochemist and researcher (born 1944)

Karl Hult (born 1944) is a Swedish biochemist and researcher. He is a professor emeritus at the Royal Institute of Technology, Stockholm, Sweden, and has contributed to research within the fields of metabolism and biocatalysis.

== Research ==
Hult's early research was in the field of fungal metabolism, and metabolic studies of Alternaria alternata lead to the discovery of the mannitol cycle.

He also studied the fungal secondary metabolite ochratoxin A, a potential human carcinogen produced by some Aspergillus and Penicillium species.

The last two decades, his research has been in the area of biocatalysis, with an interest in both the fundamental understanding of enzyme function and mechanism as well as more applied research. The work has been centered on the fungal enzyme Pseudozyma (formerly Candida) antarctica lipase B.

== Education ==
- 197? Master of Science in chemical engineering from the Royal Institute of Technology, Stockholm, Sweden.
- 1980 PhD in biochemistry
- 1984 Assistant professor
- 1985 Associate professor
- 1986 Professor
