= Holt, California =

Unincorporated community in California, United States

- Unincorporated community
- Location within California Location within the United States
- Coordinates: 37°56′04″N 121°25′38″W
- Country: United States
- State: California
- County: San Joaquin
- Elevation: 0 ft (0 m)
- Time zone: UTC-8 (Pacific (PST))
  - Summer (DST): UTC-7 (PDT)
- ZIP code: 95234
- Area code: 209
- GNIS feature ID: 252690

Holt is an unincorporated community in San Joaquin County, California, United States. Holt is located on Roberts Island along the BNSF Railway's Stockton Subdivision line 7.5 miles (12.1 km) west of downtown Stockton and on California State Route 4. Holt has a post office with ZIP code 95234, which was established in 1902. The community was named after the Holt brothers, the founders of the Holt Manufacturing Company, which later became the Caterpillar company.

== Climate ==
According to the Köppen Climate Classification system, Holt has a warm-summer Mediterranean climate, abbreviated "Csa" on climate maps.
