= Senator Holt (disambiguation) =

Rush Holt Sr. (1905–1955) was a U.S. Senator from West Virginia from 1935 to 1941. Senator Holt may also refer to:

- David Holt (politician) (born 1979), Oklahoma State Senate
- Elmer Holt (1884–1945), Montana State Senate
- Hines Holt (1805–1865), Georgia State Senate
- Jim Holt (Arkansas politician) (born 1965), Arkansas State Senate
- Saxon W. Holt (1871–1940), Virginia State Senate
