= Maurice Holt =

Major-General Sir Maurice Holt KCB KCMG DSO
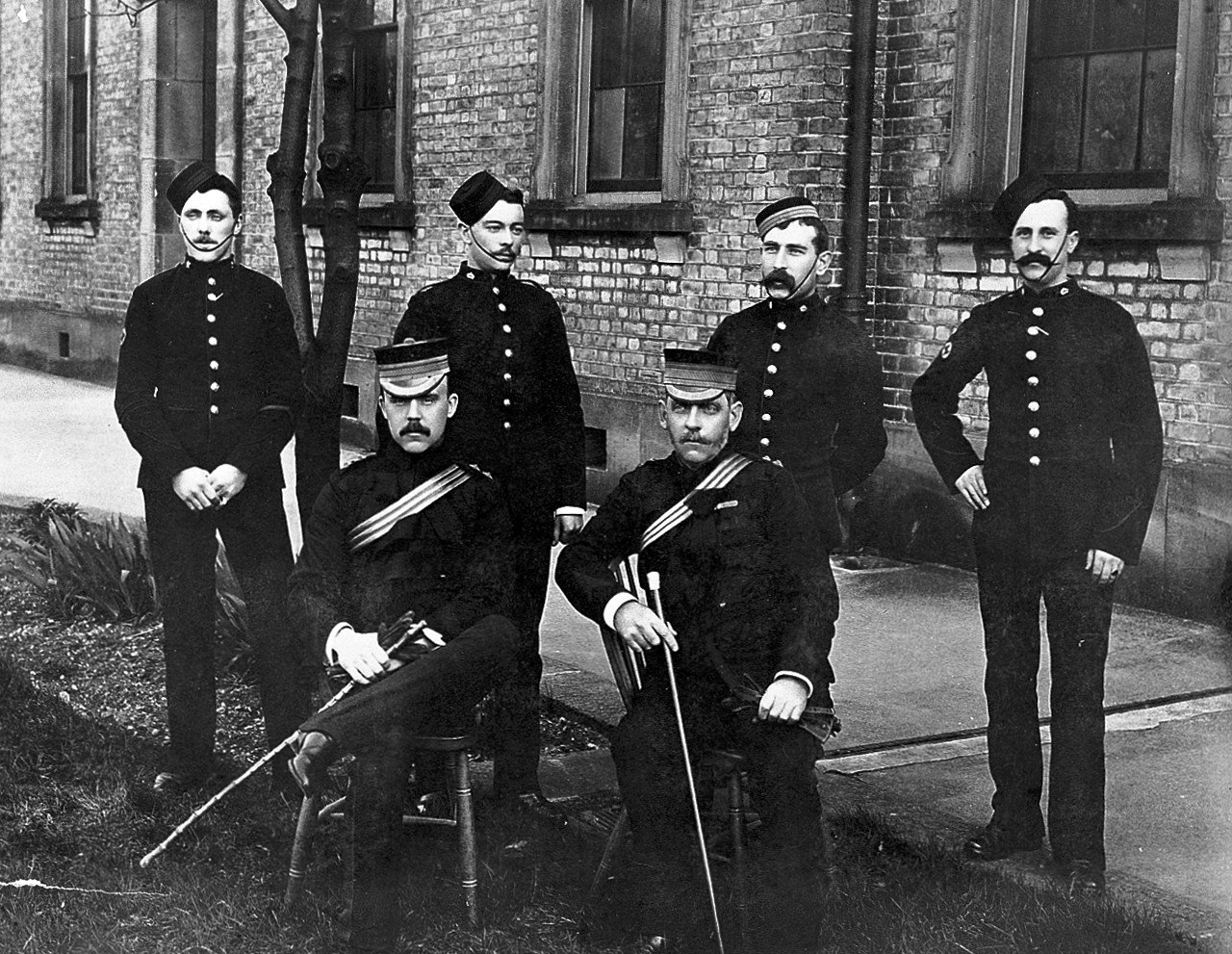
- Maurice Holt is at bottom left
- Born: Maurice Percy Cue Holt; 8 June 1862; Kingston upon Thames, Surrey, England
- Died: 6 September 1954 (aged 92) Aldershot, Hampshire, England

Major-General Sir Maurice Percy Cue Holt, KCB, KCMG, DSO (8 June 1862 – 6 September 1954) was a senior British Army medical officer of the First World War.

== Early life and career ==
Holt was born in Kingston on Thames, Surrey, the son of Maurice Holt and his wife, Ada Holt. He was educated at King's College School and King's College Hospital. He joined the Army in 1887.

Holt was commissioned into the Royal Army Medical Corps in 1887. He served as a medical officer with the Sambana and North Zululand expeditions of 1895, before seeing active service in the Second Boer War in South Africa, where he was present at the Siege of Ladysmith. For his service in this war, he was awarded the Distinguished Service Order (DSO) in the October 1902 South African Honours list. He served throughout the First World War, and was made Knight Commander of the Order of St Michael and St George (KCMG) in 1917 and Knight Commander of the Order of the Bath (KCB) in 1919 in connection with his services. He was also made a Commander of the Legion of Honour by the French government in 1919.

He retired from the army in 1922. Between 1928 and 1922, Holt was Colonel Commandant of the Royal Army Medical Corps.

== Death ==
He died in Aldershot, Hampshire, aged 92.
