= Andrew Holt (judge) =

American judge

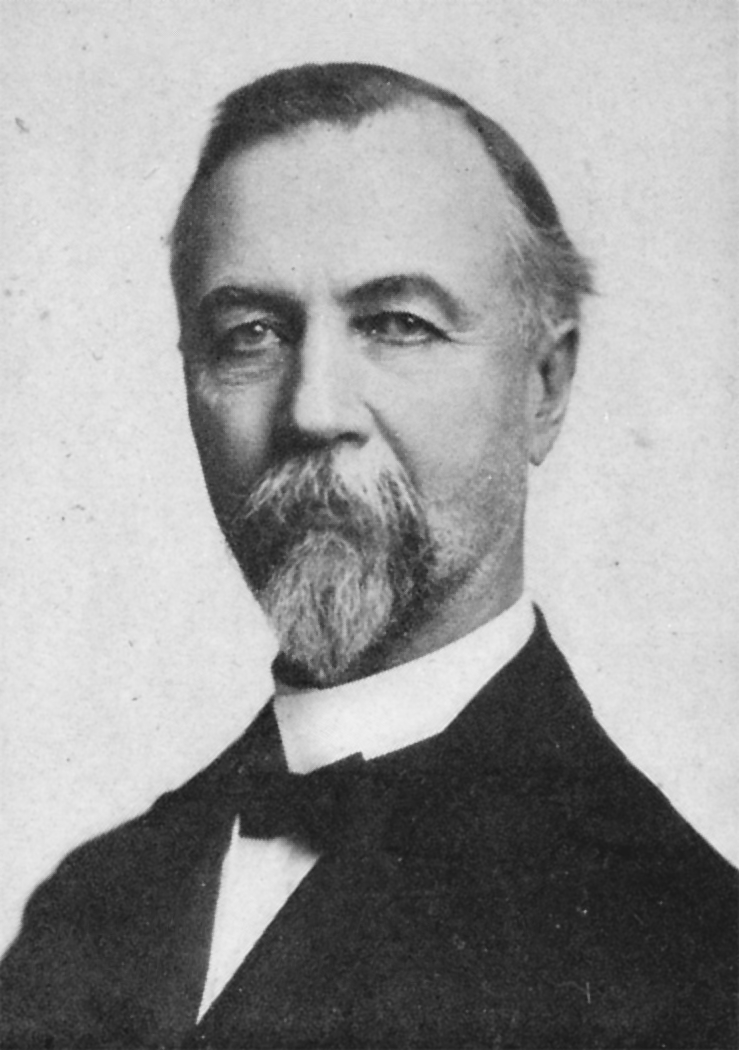
Andrew Holt

Andrew Holt (May 20, 1855 – February 11, 1948) was an American jurist.

Born in East Union, Minnesota, Holt went to Gustavus Adolphus College and then graduated from the University of Minnesota in 1880. Holt was admitted to the Minnesota bar in 1881 and then practiced law in Minneapolis, Minnesota. He served as municipal judge and then as district court judge in 1904. Holt served on the Minnesota Supreme Court from 1912 to 1942. He was the first supreme court justice born in Minnesota. Holt died at his home in Minneapolis, Minnesota.
