= Alfred Holt (cricketer) =

English cricketer (1863–1942)

Personal information
- Full name: Alfred Holt
- Born: 2 March 1863; City of London, England
- Died: 3 February 1942 (aged 78); Battersea, London, England
- Batting: Left-handed
- Bowling: Left-arm fast

Domestic team information
- Years: Team
- 1883: Marylebone Cricket Club

Career statistics
Competition	First-class
Matches	2
Runs scored	39
Batting average	9.75
100s/50s	–/–
Top score	31
Catches/stumpings	–/–
- Source: Cricinfo, 23 June 2019

Alfred Holt (2 March 1863 – 3 February 1942) was an English first-class cricketer.

Holt was born at the City of London. He made his debut in first-class cricket for the Gentlemen of England against Oxford University at Oxford in 1881. He made a second appearance in first-class cricket in 1883 for the Marylebone Cricket Club against Kent at Lord's. He scored 39 runs across his two matches, with a high score of 31. He died at Battersea in February 1942.
