= Medford Island =

Island in California

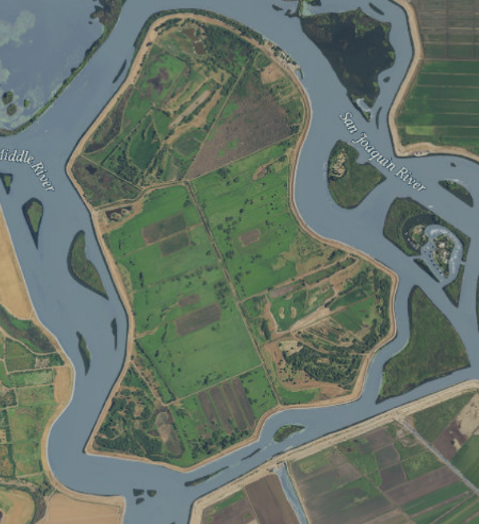
- USGS aerial imagery of Medford Island

- Location within Sacramento-San Joaquin River Delta Location within California Location within the United States

Geography
- Location: Northern California
- Coordinates: 38.0371435°N 121.5113407°W
- Adjacent to: Sacramento–San Joaquin River Delta

Administration
- United States
- State: California
- County: San Joaquin

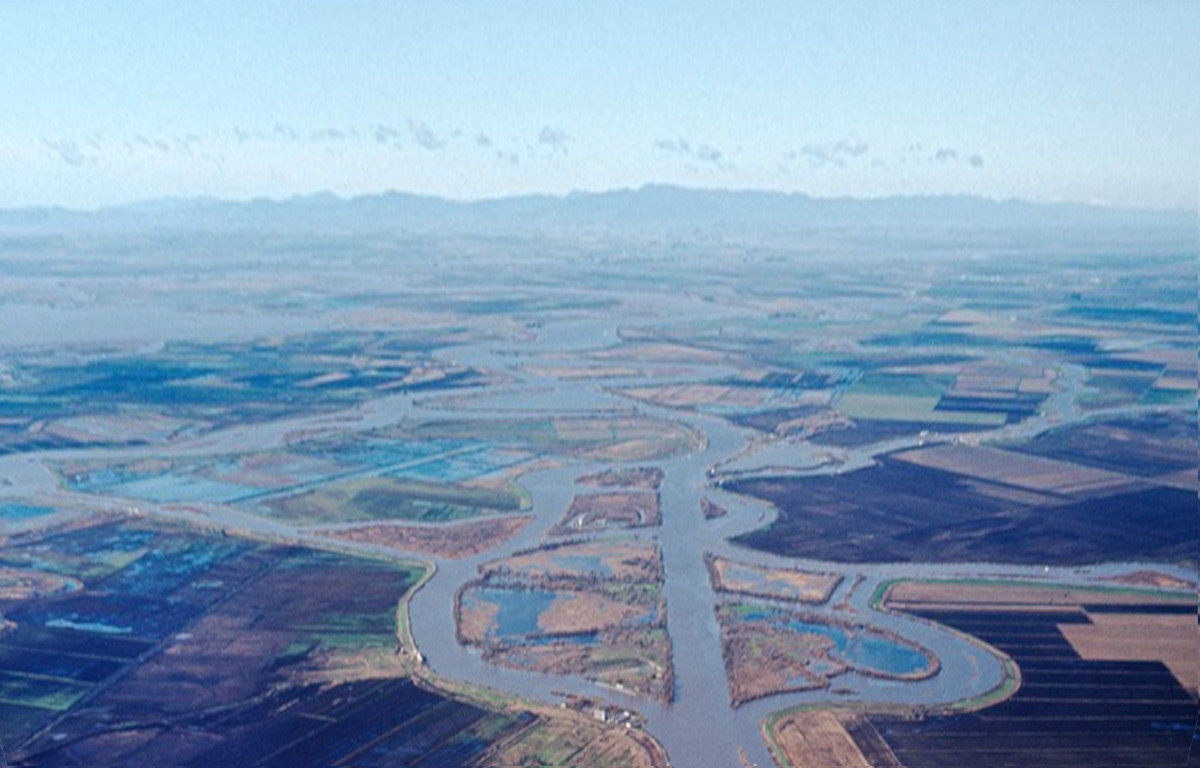
An aerial photo, looking northwest, taken in 1965. Medford Island can be seen to the north and west of Tinsley Island; to its southeast (below it in the photo) are Fern Island, Headreach Island and Tule Island respectively.

Medford Island is a small island in the San Joaquin River delta, in California. It is part of San Joaquin County, and managed by Reclamation District 2041. Its coordinates are 38.0371435°N 121.5113407°W.
