= William H. Holt =

American judge

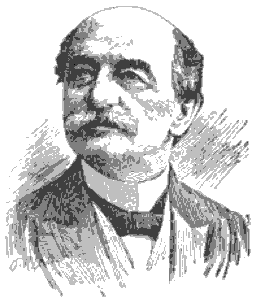
- Born: William Henry Holt; November 29, 1842; Bath County, Kentucky
- Died: March 6, 1919 (aged 76); Pewee Valley, Kentucky
- Education: Albany Law School
- Occupation: Jurist

William Henry Holt (November 29, 1842 – March 6, 1919) was the first judge of the United States District Court for the District of Puerto Rico, as established by the Foraker Act of 1900. Holt was appointed to this position by President William McKinley, and served a single four-year term from 1900 to 1904.

== Biography ==
Holt was born on November 29, 1842, in Bath County, Kentucky. He was educated in the common schools of Kentucky and later at the Twinsburg Institute in Ohio and the Fort Edward Institute in New York. He graduated, summa cum laude, in 1862, from Albany Law School. He was admitted to the Kentucky bar in 1863 and began practicing law in Mt. Sterling, Kentucky. During this time period he campaigned against slavery and in favor of the Fourteenth Amendment. In 1884, Holt was elected Associate Justice of the Kentucky Court of Errors and Appeals serving as chief justice from 1890 to 1892.

== District Court service ==
In 1900, President McKinley offered Holt the office of United States district judge for the newly created United States District Court for the District of Puerto Rico, although Holt had not solicited for the job. He accepted the appointment on June 5, 1900, and moved to San Juan, Puerto Rico. Holt oversaw the transition, both from a Spanish Legal System to an American Legal System and from a Military Justice System to a Civilian Justice System. He established local rules for the court. He served on the court until the expiration of his term in mid 1904.

== Later life ==
After the expiration of his term, Holt returned to Kentucky, living in Pewee Valley. He resumed the practice of law, which he continued until his death on March 6, 1919.

Preceded by New position	Judge, United States District Court for the District of Puerto Rico; 1900–1904	Succeeded by Charles F. McKenna
