= Venice Island (California) =

Island in Northern California, United States

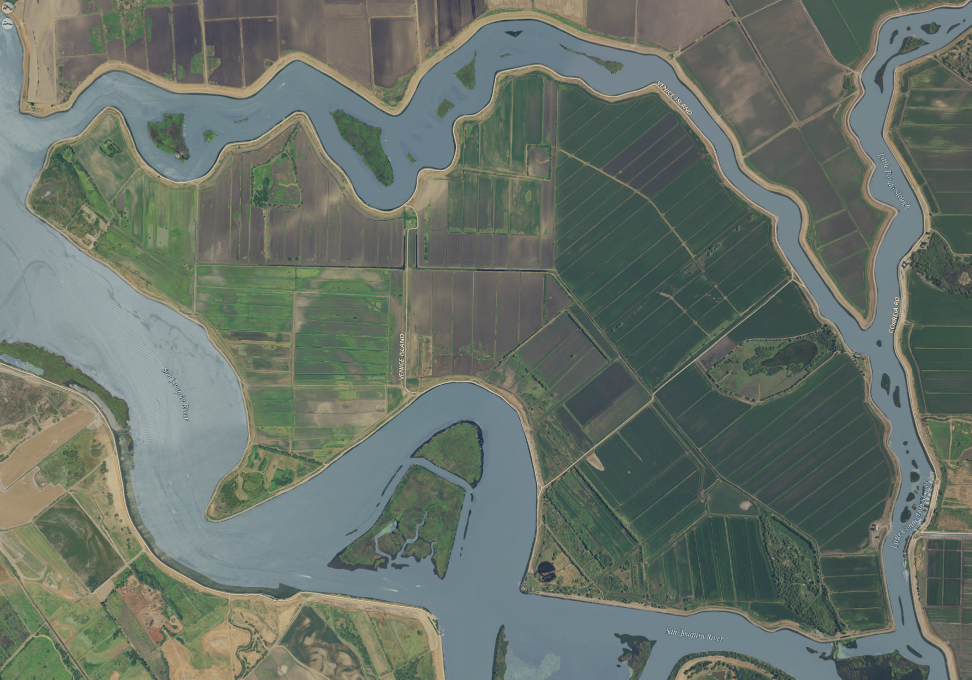
- USGS aerial imagery.

- Location within Sacramento-San Joaquin River Delta Location within California

Geography
- Location: Northern California
- Coordinates: 38°04′30″N 121°32′04″W
- Adjacent to: Sacramento-San Joaquin River Delta
- Area: 3,100 acres (1,300 ha)

Administration
- United States
- State: California
- County: San Joaquin

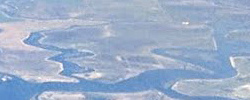
Venice Island in an aerial photo taken looking toward the east in 2018.

Venice Island is an island in the Sacramento-San Joaquin River Delta, fifteen kilometres (9.3 miles) northwest of Stockton. It is in San Joaquin County, California, and managed by Reclamation District 2023.

It is owned by Barron Hilton and the DiNapoli family.

The 3,100-acre (1,300 ha) island is bounded on the north- and northeast by Potato Slough, on the southeast by Little Connection Slough, on the south by the Stockton Deepwater Channel Venice Cut, and on the west by the San Joaquin River-Stockton Deepwater Shipping Channel.

== See also ==
- List of islands of California
