= Roberts Island (California) =

Island in California

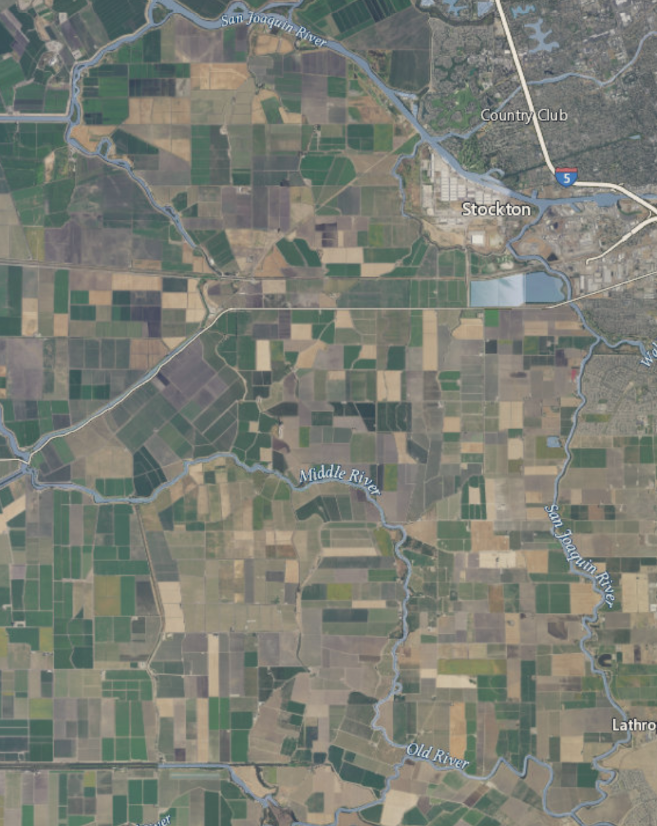

- Location within Sacramento-San Joaquin River Delta Location within California Location within the United States

Geography
- Location: Northern California
- Coordinates: 37.9049250°N 121.3852250°W
- Adjacent to: Sacramento–San Joaquin River Delta

Administration
- United States
- State: California
- County: San Joaquin

Roberts Island is an island in the San Joaquin River delta, in California. It is part of San Joaquin County, and managed by Reclamation Districts 544 (Upper Roberts Island), 524 (Middle Roberts Island) and 684 (Lower Roberts Island). Its coordinates are 37.9049250°N 121.3852250°W.

The community of Holt is on Roberts Island. BNSF Railway's Stockton Subdivision and California State Route 4 cross the island.
