= McDonald Island (California) =

Island in the United States

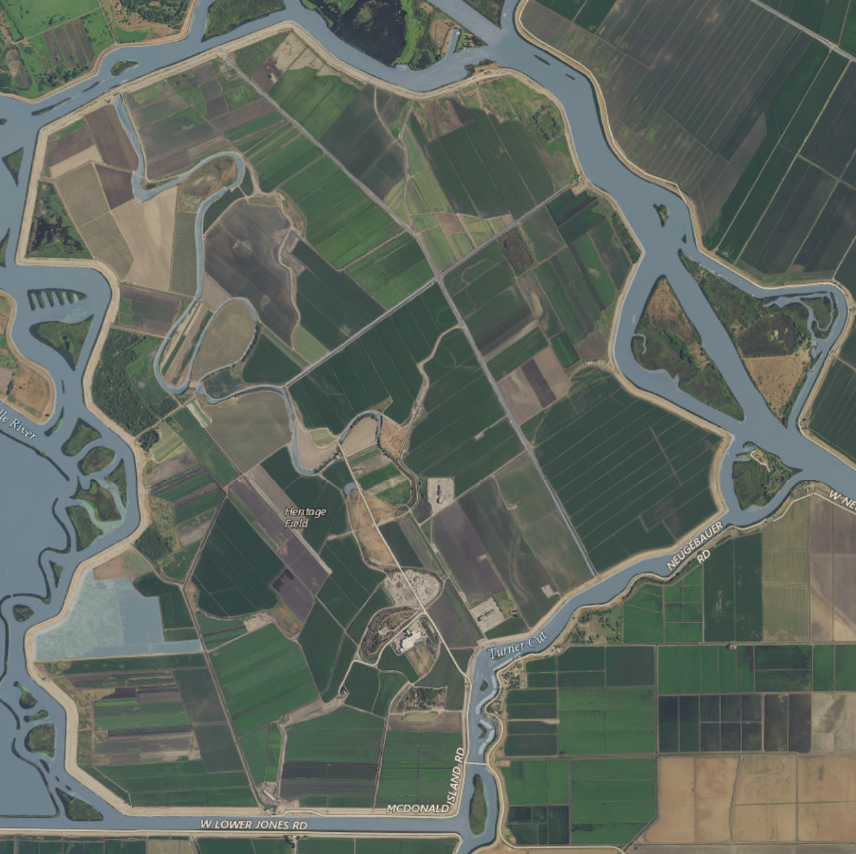

- Location within Sacramento-San Joaquin River Delta Location within California Location within the United States

Geography
- Location: Northern California
- Coordinates: 38.001311°N 121.489951°W
- Adjacent to: Sacramento-San Joaquin River Delta
- Area: 5,900 acres (2,400 ha)

Administration
- United States
- State: California
- County: San Joaquin

McDonald Island is an island in the Sacramento-San Joaquin River Delta, 53 km (33 mi) south of Sacramento. The 2,400 ha (5,900-acre) island is bounded on the north by San Joaquin River, on the west by Middle River and Latham Slough, and on the south by Empire Cut. It appears unlabeled on a 1913 United States Geological Survey map of the area, and on a 1952 USGS map as "McDonald Tract".

It is in San Joaquin County, California, and managed by Reclamation District 2030.
