= Chain Island =

Island in California

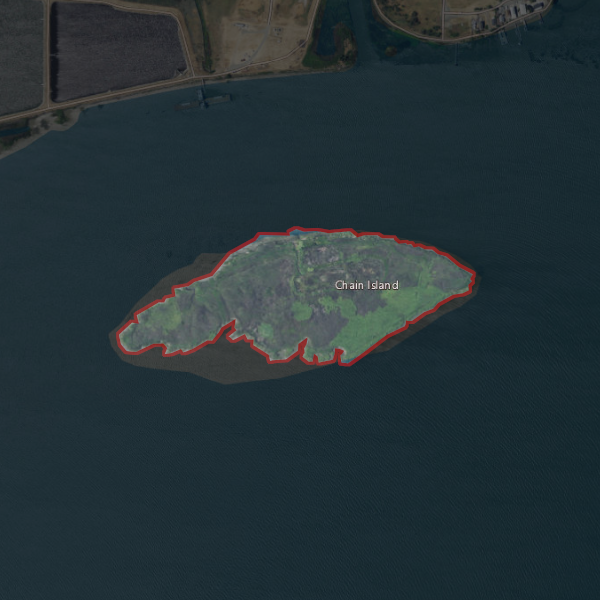
- USGS aerial imagery of Chain Island

- Location within Sacramento-San Joaquin River Delta Location within California Location within the United States

Geography
- Location: Northern California
- Coordinates: 38°04′11″N 121°51′11″W
- Adjacent to: Sacramento–San Joaquin River Delta
- Area: 41.81 acres (16.92 ha)
- Highest elevation: 0 ft (0 m)

Administration
- United States
- State: California
- County: Sacramento

Chain Island is an island in Suisun Bay, downstream of the Sacramento–San Joaquin River Delta in northern California, and the westernmost piece of land in Sacramento County. In the late 1800s, it was considered an "obstruction to navigation" on the Sacramento River. As it was built up significantly from hydraulic mining tailings upstream on the river, plans were made in the early 20th century to remove it and recoup costs by mining the debris. However, this never happened; it was sold by the California State Lands Commission to a private individual in 1959, who listed it for sale the next year. In April 2016, the deed for the island was transferred; as of December 2022, Sacramento County assesses its land value at $18,622.

== Geography ==
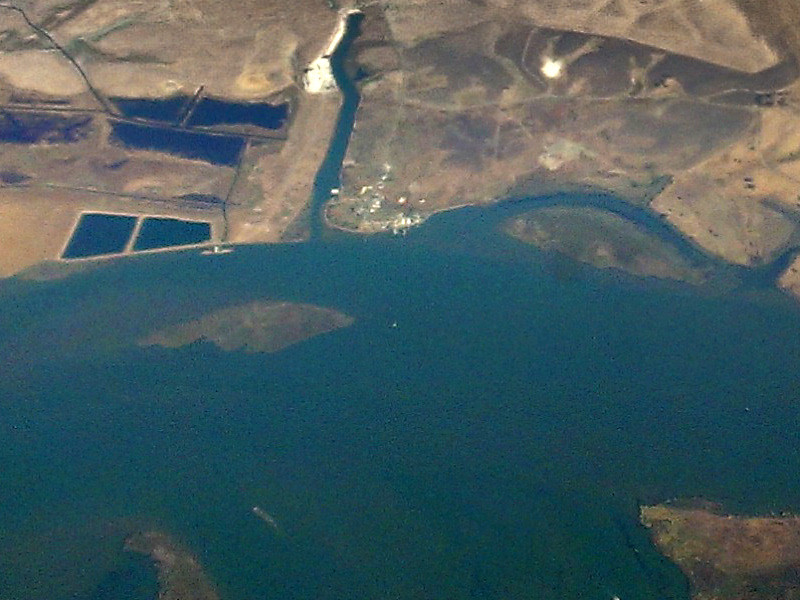
An aerial photo taken looking north in 2015. Chain Island can be seen on the left, west of Montezuma Island.

Chain Island's coordinates are 38°04′11″N 121°51′11″W. Sacramento County assesses the island as parcel #15801200070000, with an area of 41.81 acres (16.92 ha). It is located in the Sacramento River, past the southeastern end of the Sacramento River Deep Water Ship Channel, at its confluence with the San Joaquin River from the south (via Broad Slough) and immediately upstream of Suisun Bay (an embayment of San Francisco Bay). To its northeast are Montezuma Island and Collinsville on the mainland; to its west is Spinner Island (and past that, Van Sickle Island). To its south are Winter Island and Browns Island, which are separated by New York Slough from the city of Pittsburg.

Chain Island is the westernmost piece of land in Sacramento County (and nearly the southernmost; only the southern half of Sherman Island, Lobree Island, Kimball Island and West Island are further south). Approximately 1,000 ft (300 m) to its south is Contra Costa County, and approximately 100 ft (30 m) to its north and west is Solano County.

The United States Geological Survey gave Chain Island's elevation as 0 ft (sea level) in 1981. It is not managed by any reclamation district, although it is designated by the State of California as a "significant natural area". Mason's lilaeopsis (Note: The source discusses several islands in the area, and in every instance but one, it names "Mason's lilaeopsis," with an "L" at the beginning of the second word. Only once, when discussing Chain Island, does it refer to "Mason's ilaeopsis" without the "L." Presumably, that one instance is a typo.) and Suisun marsh aster grow there. In 1994, it was reported by the Modesto Bee that large sturgeon were being caught at Chain Island; in 1999 the Martinez News-Gazette said that "good numbers of striped bass" could be found near there. In 2003, a 60 lb (27 kg), 63 in (1,600 mm) sturgeon was caught at Chain Island; in 2006, a 53 lb (24 kg) sturgeon was caught there. As of 2014, sturgeon fishing at Chain Island was still good.

== History ==
The first Europeans to document Chain Island's existence were the party of Cadwalader Ringgold, who made a survey of it (and other islands in the area) on an 1850 expedition.

In 1902, plans were made for controlling flooding on the Sacramento and San Joaquin Rivers by straightening their channels to drain more quickly into the sea; Chain Island was one of many landforms in the path of this direct flow, and it was identified for removal. In May 1903, the War Department awarded a contract to a company of what it called "California capitalists" for the removal of the island; at the time, it was surveyed as comprising 182 acres (74 ha) of land, and "an obstruction to navigation". The project had previously been supported by State of California engineers, but prohibitive costs prevented it from being undertaken. The capitalists offered to perform the work free of charge, on the reasoning that gold from earlier large-scale hydraulic mining operations during the California gold rush would be found in the material removed. As the Sacramento and San Joaquin drain large areas of California, "great mountains" of material had been washed into the river beds over time. The removal of the island would, therefore, be combined with a placer mining operation to recoup the entire expense of removal. This included the cost of adhering to the War Department contract's "severe conditions", including transportation of all removed material "far up on the shore" to be impounded behind a dam (to prevent it from washing back into the river). The project was endorsed by the State Auditing Board to the Commissioner of Public Works. It was hypothesized that, if the project succeeded, corporations would be organized to "scoop out the entire river bed".

This project was never carried out. By December 1904, the Engineering Board at Sioux City, Iowa, outlined a plan for ameliorating flooding in the Sacramento–San Joaquin river system, in which it was announced that a number of "pet schemes" would "die after a more or less lengthy and sickly existence". Chain Island was shown on a 1907 map made by the United States Geological Survey. In 1918, a navigational buoy was installed to mark a shoal near Chain Island; the buoy was discontinued in 1938.

On January 26, 1959, a notice was made that the California State Lands Commission was offering Chain Island for sale in February; by then, its area was given as 41.81 acres (16.92 ha), and the minimum bid was $5,226.25 ($57,719 in 2025). It was discovered that the plots from the original 1902 survey were significantly different from the actual location of the island in 1957, and California's attorney general determined that the island could be sold according to boundaries from the 1957 survey. In February, the Sacramento County Board of Supervisors voted to inform the state of California that the county was "interested in the possible purchase of Chain Island in the delta area for a possible development as a park", and request that the sale be delayed for two weeks. On March 25, however, the island was sold to Russell Gallaway III, a Sacramento businessman, who planned to use it as a "hunting and fishing retreat". He paid $5,258.20 for it ($58,072 in 2025). The next year, an advertisement was placed offering the island (now claimed to have 58 acres (23 ha)) for sale for $7,500 ($81,623 in 2025). In April 2016, the deed for the island was transferred. As of December 2022, Sacramento County assesses its land value at $18,622.
