= Stockton Deepwater Shipping Channel =

Deepwater water channel in the United States

Stockton Deep Water Ship Channel
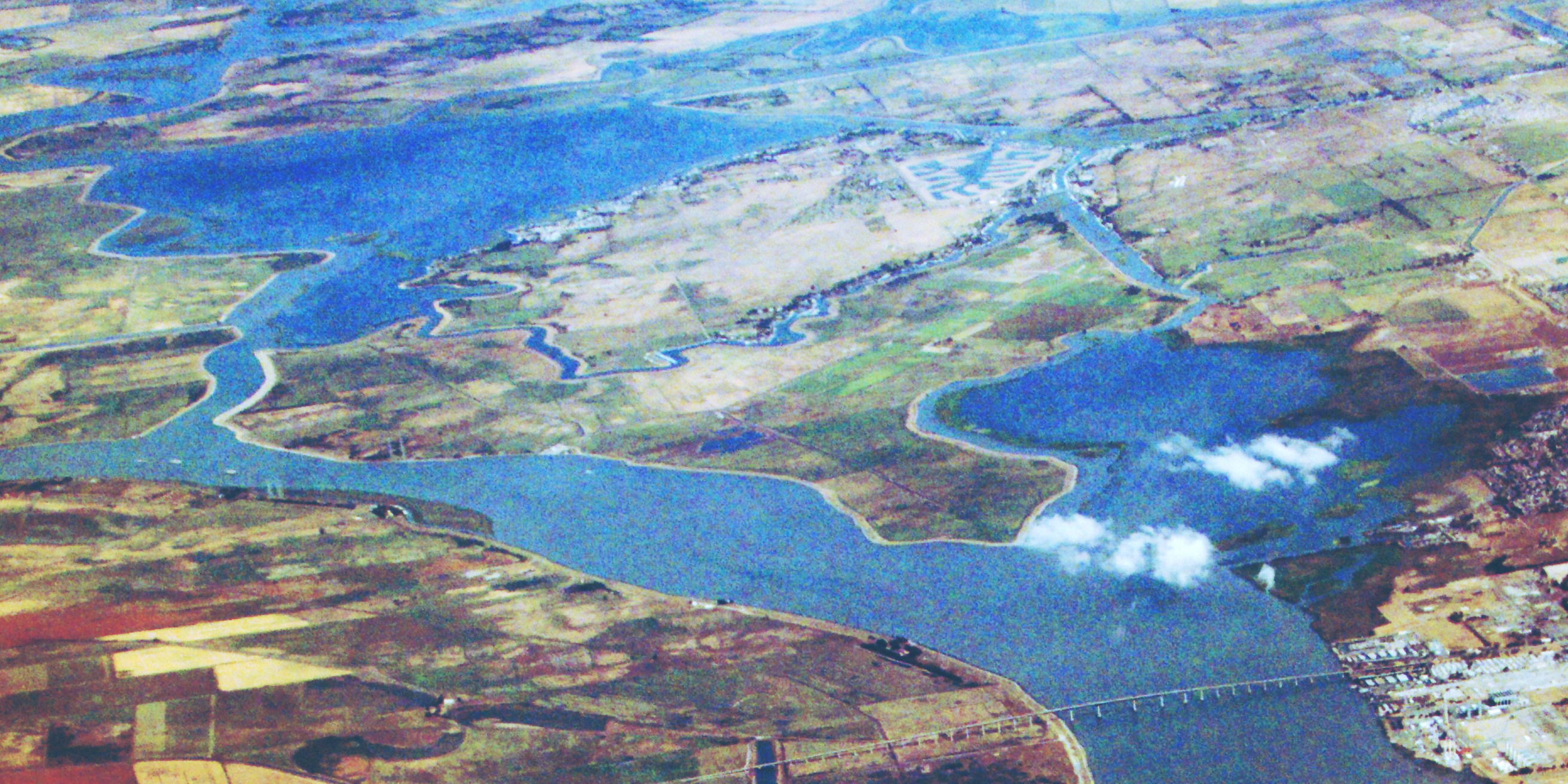

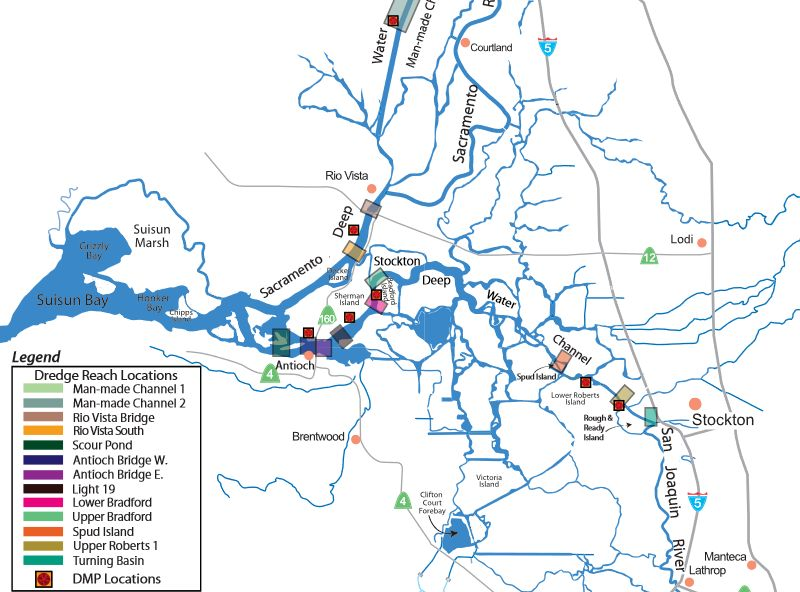
- Map Of The Stockton Deep Water Ship Channel
- Location: Sacramento County, San Joaquin County
- Country: United States

Specifications
- Length: 41 miles (66 km)

Geography
- Start point: San Joaquin River
- End point: Port of Stockton

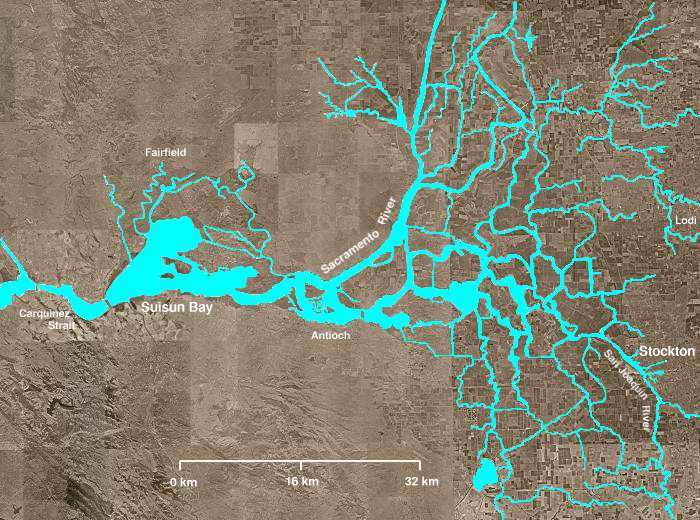
Sacramento–San Joaquin River Delta

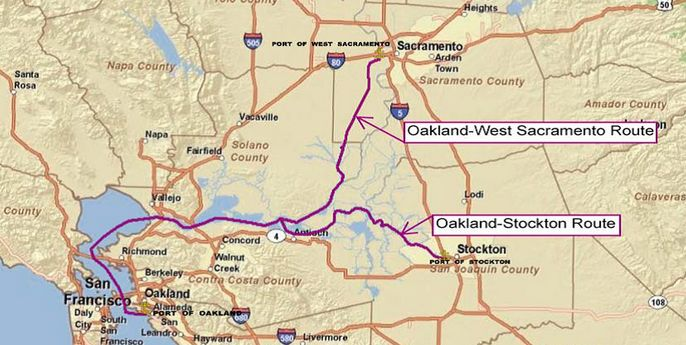
California's Green Trade Corridor, is part of the Stockton Deepwater Shipping Channel

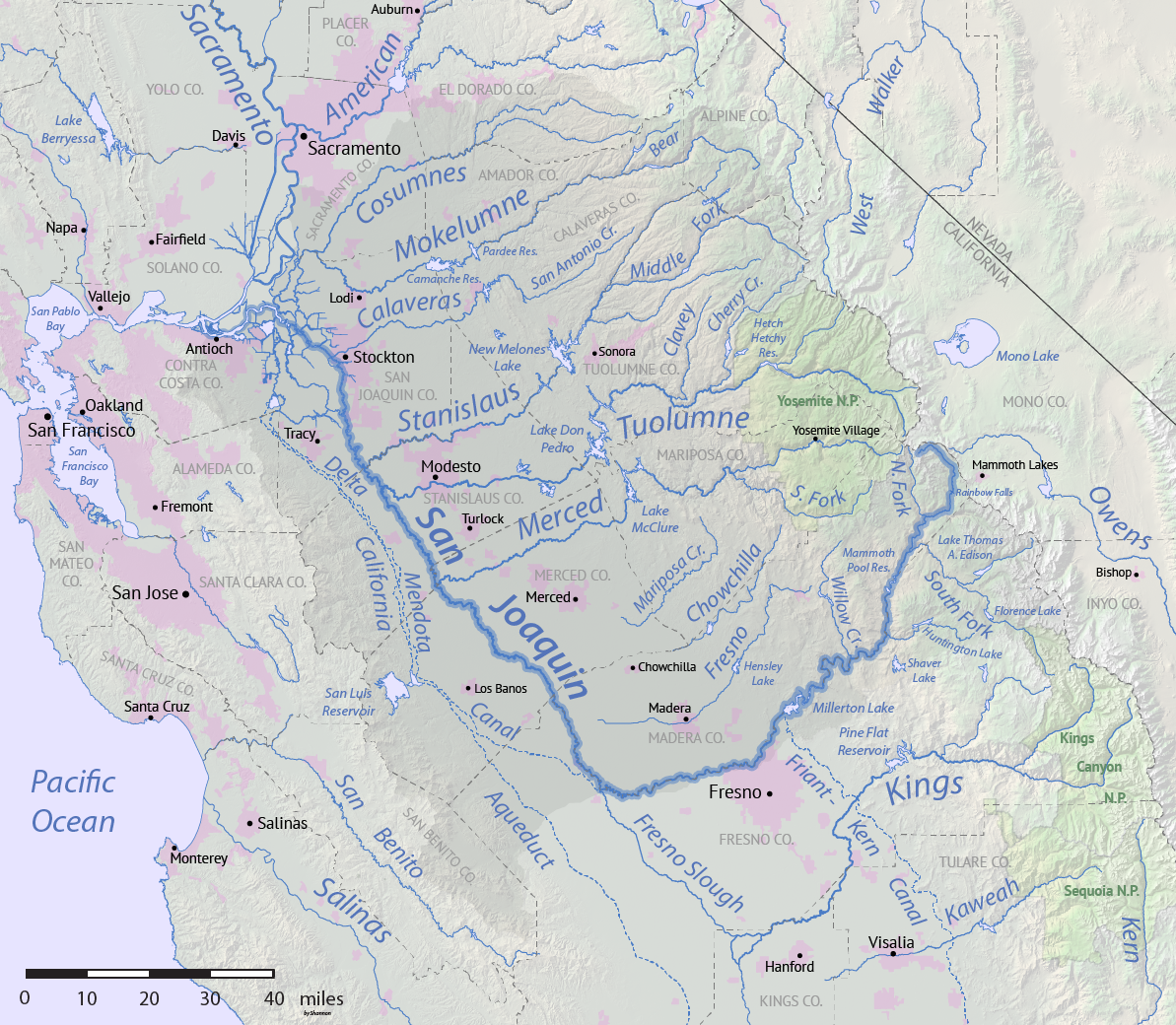
Map showing the San Joaquin River

Stockton Deepwater Shipping Channel, also called the Baldwin-Stockton Deepwater Shipping Channel or Stockton Deep Water Channel, is a manmade deepwater water channel that runs from Suisun Bay and the Sacramento River - Sacramento Deep Water Ship Channel to the Port of Stockton and the Stockton Channel in California. The Stockton Ship Channel is 41 mi (66 km) long and about 37 ft (11 m) deep, allowing up to Panamax size ocean ships access to the Port of Stockton at the City of Stockton. The Stockton Deepwater Shipping Channel is part of the vast Sacramento–San Joaquin River Delta that has a connection to the Pacific Ocean. Stockton Deepwater Shipping Channel is also called the lower San Joaquin River.

== History ==
At the time of the 1849 California Gold Rush ocean steamboats could travel up the San Joaquin River to Fresno. As San Joaquin Valley grew agriculturally and river water was used for crops, the river became shallow. With slower moving water, silt began to build up in the river and it became even shallower. By 1890 the city of Stockton had lost its importance as a seaport. By 1910 the city had created proposals to increase the depth of the lower river by dredging; however, the plans were delayed by World War I. In 1925 the city began a $1.3 million bond campaign dedicated to dredging the lower San Joaquin. Stockton partnered with the federal and state governments in 1926 to form a $8.2 million fund to change the river to a new channel. In 1928 the river-channel project began. The river was both widened and deepened. To straighten the river, meanders and oxbow lakes were removed. Major straightening cuts were built at Hog Island, Venice Island and Mandeville Island, along with five minor straightening cuts. The new deepwater channel was now 4 mi (6.4 km) long and had a depth of 37 ft (11 m). As silt build-up still continues, major dredging was performed in both 1968 and 1982. The Stockton Deep Water Ship Channel can handle fully loaded ocean vessels of up to 60,000 short tons (120,000,000 lb; 54,000,000 kg) and up to 900 ft (270 m) long. Various proposals to deepen the channel have been evaluated over the decades including EIS documents prepared by USACE; however, the project was terminated due in part to adverse environmental effects.

== Environmental concern ==
The slowing of the river-channel has unexpectedly caused low dissolved oxygen levels in the lower San Joaquin River water. The low dissolved oxygen has hurt the fish populations. The three causes are the straightening of the river, pollution from the harbors and cities, and poor tidal mixing.

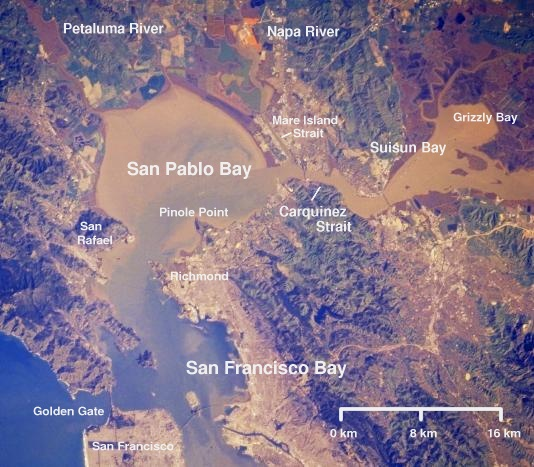
San Pablo Bay with Suisun Bay at upper right.

== Baldwin Deepwater Shipping Channel ==
Baldwin Deepwater Shipping Channel, also called the John F. Baldwin Shipping Channel, runs from the San Francisco Bay through the San Pablo Bay and Suisun Bay to the entrance to the Stockton Ship Channels. Baldwin Deepwater Shipping Channel has a maximum depth of 45 feet and is maintained to 35 feet. The Baldwin Shipping Channel is 600 feet wide. Named after John F. Baldwin Jr., an American military officer and later a U.S. Representative from California. The Carquinez Strait is part of the John F. Baldwin Shipping Channel. Also on the John F. Baldwin Shipping Channel is the: Browns Island, West Island, Winter Island, Broad Slough, New York Slough, Kimball Island, Sherman Island, Sherman Lake, Chipps Island, Mallard Island, Simonons Point, Stake Point, Honker Bay, Roe Island, Port Costa, Port Chicago, Ryer Island, Point Edith, I-680, Bayo Vista, Mococo, Benicia, Interstate 80, Crolona Heights, Point Pinole Regional Shoreline, Richmond, Interstate 580 and Mare Island Naval Shipyard

== On Stockton Deepwater Shipping Channel ==
On the Stockton Deepwater Shipping Channel:

- Suisun Bay - John F. Baldwin Shipping Channel
- Sacramento River - Sacramento Deep Water Ship Channel
- Dow Wetlands Preserve
- City of Antioch
- Kimbell Island
- Antioch Dunes National Wildlife Refuge
- West Island
- Antioch Bridge
- Sherman Island
- Big Break - Big Break Regional Shoreline
- Bradford Island
- Blind Point
- Jersey Island
- Jersey Point
- False River
- Three Mile Slough
- Santa Clara Shoal
- Fisherman's Cut
- Oulton Point
- Libordi Shoals
- San Andreas Shoals
- Mokelumne River
- Webb Point
- Potato Point - Little Potato Slough
- Bouldin Island
- Old River
- Hayes Point
- Prisoner's Point
- Rindge Tract
- Mandeville Island
- Mandeville Tip County Park
- Mandeville Point
- Mandeville Cut
- Venice Island
- Venice Reach
- Middle River
- Three River Reach
- Medford Island
- Burns Reach
- Little Potato Slough
- Ward Island
- Ward cut
- Tinsley Island
- White Slough
- Whiskey Slough
- Columbia Cut
- Fern Island
- White Slough
- Headreach Island
- Tule Island
- Shima Bend
- Haypress Reach
- Spud Island
- Hog Island Cut
- Hog Island
- Acker Island
- Turner Cut
- White Slough
- Vulcan Island
- Tenmile Slough
- Riverpiont landing
- Buckley Cove Park
- Burns Cutoff
- Calaveras River
- Stockton Golf and Country Club
- Browns Island
- Smith Channel
- Louis Park
- Atherton Island
- Ruff and Ready Island - San Francisco Naval Communication
- Port of Stockton
- Stockton Channel
- City of Stockton
- Upper San Joaquin River

== See also ==
- List of rivers of California
- San Joaquin River National Wildlife Refuge
