= Kimball Island =

Island in California

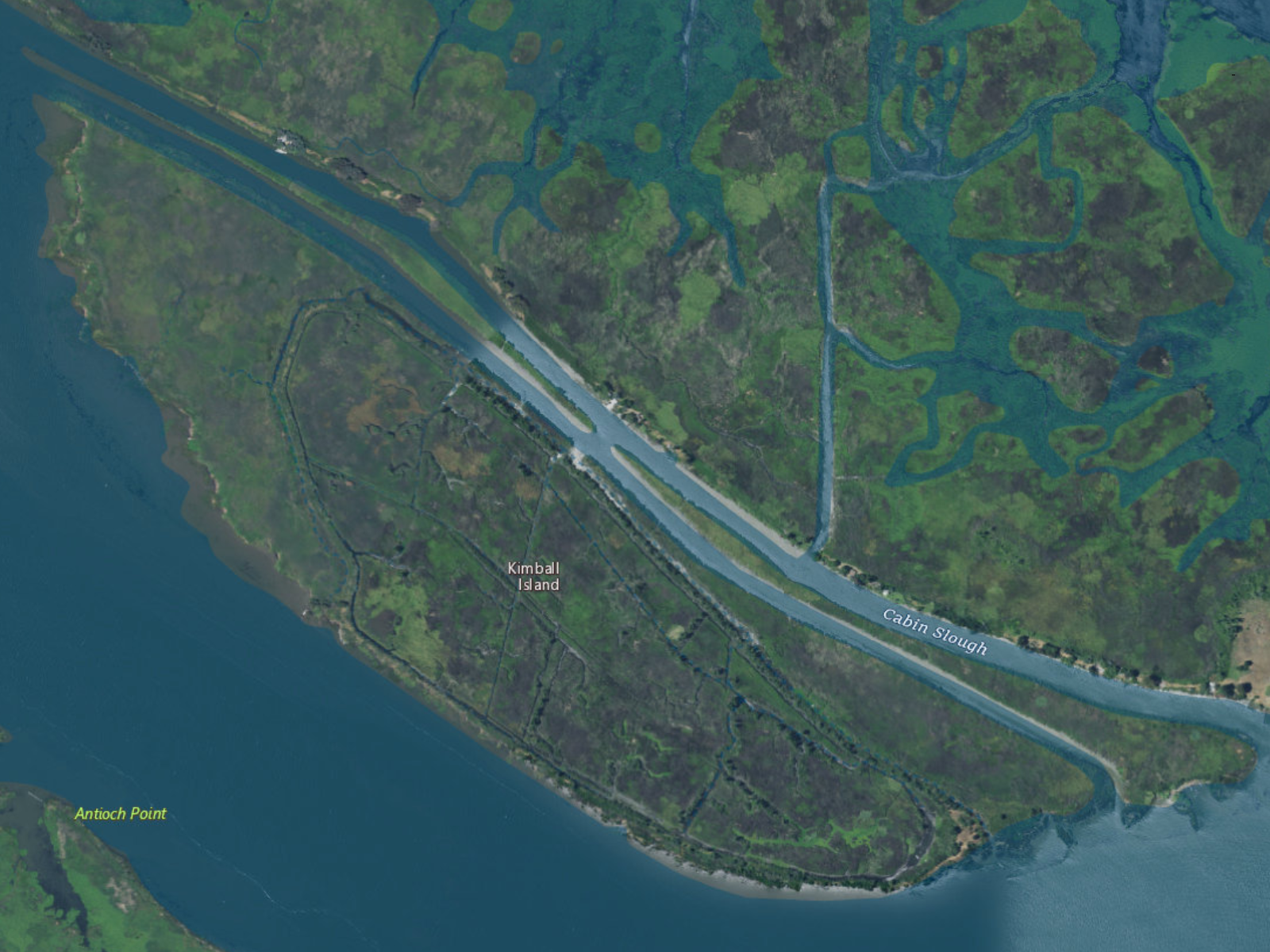
- USGS aerial imagery of Kimball Island; Antioch is across the San Joaquin River to the south, and Sherman Island is across Cabin Slough to the north.
- Interactive map of Kimball Island

Geography
- Location: Northern California
- Coordinates: 38°01′38″N 121°49′00″W
- Adjacent to: Sacramento–San Joaquin River Delta
- Highest elevation: 0 ft (0 m)

Administration
- United States
- State: California
- County: Sacramento

Kimball Island (formerly known as Hammond Island) is a small island in the Sacramento–San Joaquin River Delta. It is located in Sacramento County, California, in the United States. Since its discovery, it has been used to grow barley, farm fish, cultivate cannabis, and as residential land. Currently, however, it is uninhabited; since 2000, it has been left to "forever be a wetland habitat", and is sometimes used as a fishing spot.

== Geography ==
Kimball Island is located in the San Joaquin River in the Sacramento–San Joaquin River Delta, west of West Island, southwest of the submerged southern tip of Sherman Island, south of the Sacramento River, and east of Winter Island. It is also south of several islands uncharted on United States Geological Survey (USGS) maps, like Lobree Island. It is part of Sacramento County, California. Its coordinates are 38°01′38″N 121°49′00″W, and the USGS measured its elevation at sea level in 1981. Since 2000, it has been uninhabited, as county officials voted for it to "forever be a wetland habitat"; currently, it is marshland, and used for wildlife mitigation.

The currents of the San Joaquin River between Kimball Island and the northern shore of Antioch are strong, and the river is not passable by swimming: in 1973, the Los Angeles Times said that "the dark green current brooks few weaknesses and no errors", and that "no one, as far as the old-timers know, has ever made it across the 600 yards that separate the small, pleasant city of Antioch in Contra Costa County from Kimball Island, a verdant strip in the distance".

== History ==
Kimball Island appears on an 1850 survey map of the San Francisco Bay area made by Cadwalader Ringgold, on which it is shown and labeled "Hammond Island" (with no relation to the island currently named Hammond Island, which is further downstream in Suisun Bay). In 1869, a real estate transaction was recorded in which George P. Sanford sold William M. Brown several acres of swamp land "near Kimball's Island". By 1871, barley was being grown there by a Captain Kimball; the Daily Evening Herald of Stockton said in March that "we have seen a bunch of barley stalks, from Kimball's Island, that are nearly 5 feet [1.5 m] long". In July of the same year, levees protecting Kimball Island from the waters of the Sacramento River failed, with Captain Kimball saying that he would "sustain damage of five or six hundred dollars in injury to growing crops".

By 1882, two ponds on Kimball Island were being used by C. Dickenson of Concord to raise German carp. The ponds were said, at the time, to contain "about 3,000 fish". Dickenson sold them primarily to other fish farmers who needed to stock breeding ponds. By 1897, asparagus was being grown there, with the Contra Costa Gazette saying that "Kimball Island asparagus commands the best price in the San Francisco market [...] it is very large, delicious and of a most excellent flavor, and in constant demand."

For some time, a navigational beacon was located at Kimball Island; it was discontinued in 1922, after having been reported missing. A cruiser had run aground on the island in 1935, stranding eight people aboard for the night. In 1935, Kimball Island was one of several locations along the San Joaquin River included in the Oakland Tribune Bass Derby, in which fishermen competed to catch the largest bass. By the late 1940s, Kimball Island had become a location for duck hunting. In 1961, the Napa Valley Register said that stripers could be caught at Kimball Island. In 1964, the Oakland Tribune reported on muskrat and beaver burrows threatening the stability of levees in the Delta, including on Kimball Island.

A number of people have lived on Kimball Island. In 1890, a Captain Mitchell had "established himself" on Kimball Island. In 1893, a man named Ah Sing (who had lived there for some time) was found dead; while murder was suspected by his friends, it was eventually found that he had died of consumption. In 1930, Kimball Island was home to Captain Henry Mason. In 1941, two men were arrested in the act of stealing an electric motor, a tractor, a gasoline engine and two lawnmowers from Kimball Island.

In 1967, a real estate development company from San Francisco made a request to Sacramento County supervisors that Kimball Island be "detached from Sacramento County and attached to Contra Costa" to develop it into a "marina-oriented subdivision". This project was never undertaken: Assistant County Counsel Fred Williams would later say that "when the developer found out what a long and complicated procedure would be involved, he gave up the idea". The next year, a different developer planned to "construct a 3,500-foot blacktop airplane landing strip", a public recreational area, and a pleasure craft marina on the island, which they would then call "Sky Island". The rezoning, transferring the land from the recreation-flood zone to the commercial zone, was approved on the condition that "provisions for water supply, sewage disposal, fire and police protection be approved by various county departments concerned and that the proposal be approved by the Federal Aviation Administration, the State Aeronautics Board and the County Board of Supervisors". It was also conditional on development being started within one year of the approval; however, these plans never materialized.

In 1983, a cannabis "plantation" was discovered on Kimball Island, with over 300 marijuana plants. As this occurred during the period when possessing or smoking cannabis was illegal in California, police responded by taking possession of the cannabis and setting it on fire.

In 2000, the Sacramento County Policy Planning Commission voted to rezone Kimball Island from "commercial recreation and flood" to "permanent agriculture and flood", in a move that was described by the Sacramento Bee as making sure it would "forever be a wetland habitat". By September, 104 acres (42 ha) of Kimball Island was owned by Steve Morgan, the founder of Wildlands Incorporated, who used the property as a mitigation bank. In 2014, three houses on the island were damaged by a wildfire.

== See also ==
- List of islands of California
