= Montezuma Island =

Island in California

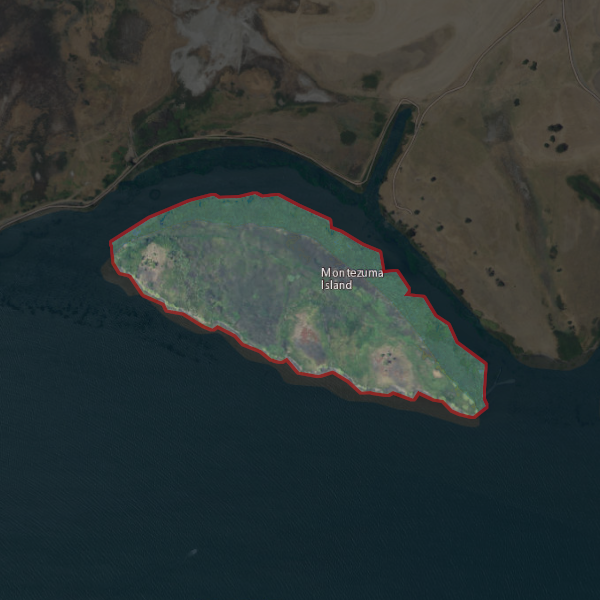
- USGS aerial imagery of Montezuma Island

- Location within Sacramento-San Joaquin River Delta Location within California Location within the United States

Geography
- Location: Northern California
- Coordinates: 38°04′28″N 121°50′23″W
- Adjacent to: Sacramento–San Joaquin River Delta
- Highest elevation: 7 ft (2.1 m)

Administration
- United States
- State: California
- County: Sacramento

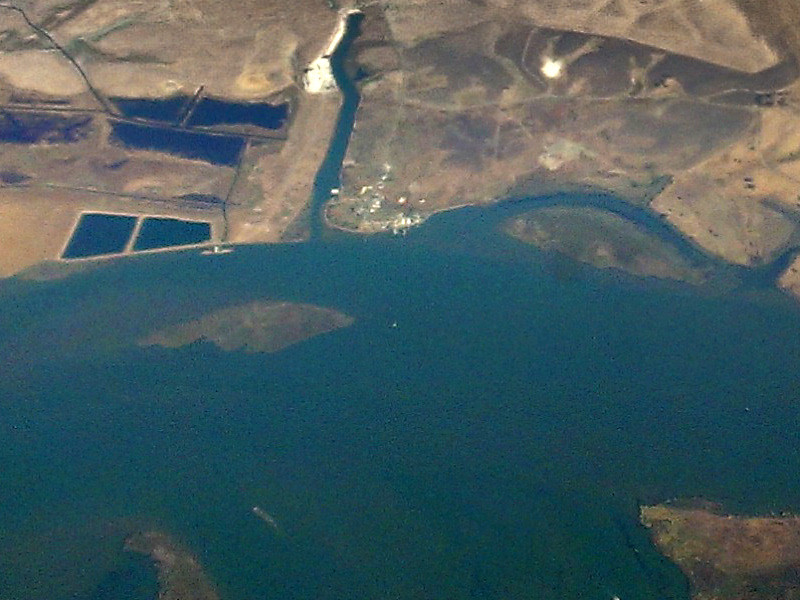
An aerial photo taken looking north in 2015. Montezuma Island can be seen on the right, east of Chain Island.

Montezuma Island is an island in Suisun Bay, an embayment of San Francisco Bay, and downstream of the Sacramento–San Joaquin River Delta. It is part of Sacramento County, California, and not managed by any reclamation district. Its coordinates are 38°04′28″N 121°50′23″W, and the United States Geological Survey measured its elevation as 7 ft (2.1 m) in 1981. It is labeled "Burnett Island" on an 1850 survey map of the San Francisco Bay area made by Cadwalader Ringgold, and shown (unlabeled) on an 1854 map of the area by Henry Lange.
