= Sherman Island =

Sherman Island may refer to:

- Sherman Island (Antarctica)
- Sherman Island (California)
