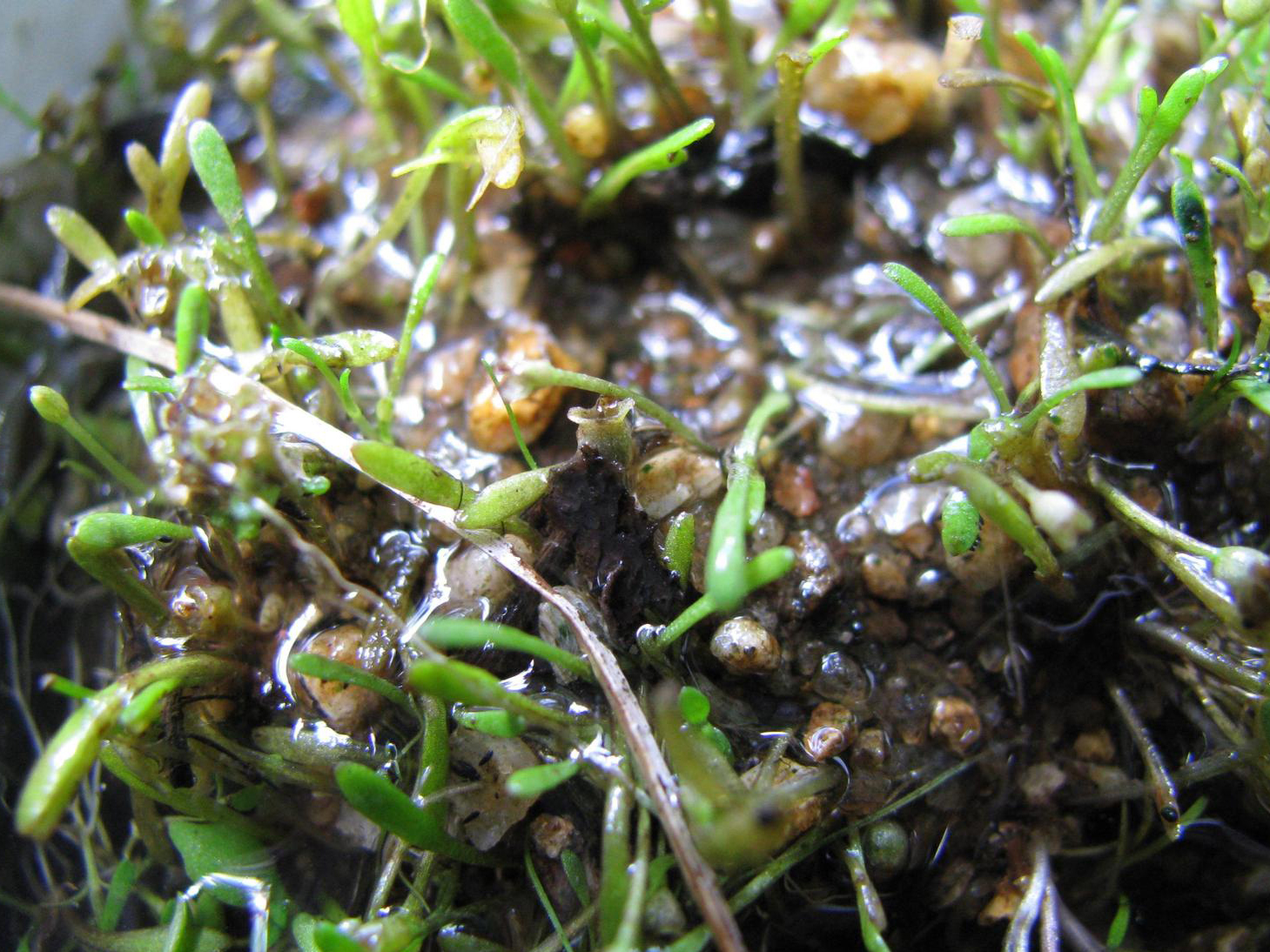

Scientific classification
- Kingdom: Plantae
- Clade: Tracheophytes
- Clade: Angiosperms
- Clade: Eudicots
- Clade: Asterids
- Order: Lamiales
- Family: Phrymaceae
- Genus: Glossostigma
- Species: G. cleistanthum

Binomial name
- Glossostigma cleistanthum W.R.Barker

= Glossostigma cleistanthum =

Species of aquatic plant

Glossostigma cleistanthum, also known as mudmat, is a freshwater aquatic plant native to Australia, New Zealand, India and East Africa. It is a cleistogamous plant, which is a type of self-pollinating plant that can propagate using non-opening flowers. Where growth is submerged, the leaves are between 0.5–2.5 inches long and bear closed, self-pollinating flowers. These leaves are nearly sessile and grow along the stem in alternating pairs that resemble rabbit ears. Where water recedes and growth is emergent, the leaves are much smaller, ranging between 0.2–0.5 inches in length. The emergent plants produce insect-pollinated flowers located on short stalks. It belongs to the family Phrymaceae which includes annuals and perennials.

== General information ==
=== Preferred aquatic conditions ===
Mudmat is a freshwater aquatic species that grows on muddy substrate in the littoral zone. Mudmat prefers to grow in the littoral zone which is the area close to the shore in a lake, sea, or river. It prefers oligotrophic conditions (high water clarity and low nutrients). It can be both submerged and emersed. When submerged, it produces cleistogamous, or self-pollinating, flowers and when emersed, produces chasmogamous, or open petal, flowers that require cross-pollination. Emersed portions of the plant are annuals and will die in the winter whereas submerged portions of the plant are perennials and stay green throughout the winter and continue to produce flowers and grow.

=== Invasive species ===
Mudmat is considered an invasive species outside of its native range. Mudmat is currently causing problems in Rhode Island, New Jersey, and Eastern Pennsylvania, with the earliest record of Mudmat in North America being in 1992 in Hamburg Cove, CT. There is concern for it as an invasive species since it is occurring in areas with species listed as endangered in Connecticut and/or New Jersey. Some of these species include: Eriocaulon parkeri, Crassula aquatica, Lilaeopsis chinensis, Limosella subulata, Myriophyllum tenellum and Heteranthera multiflora. It grows quickly and due to its small size is not expected to interfere with recreational boating or other forms of recreational lake use. In some areas it can reach densities as large as 25,000 plants per square meter. Although it is unclear how G. cleistanthum was originally introduced to the United States, one possibility is that it was introduced along with aquarium plants. Subsequent dispersal is expected to be due to migrating waterfowl, watersheds, boating and fishing activities.
