= Woodland Davis Clean Water Agency =

The Woodland Davis Clean Water Agency (WDCWA) is a joint project between the cities of Woodland and Davis in Yolo County, California; also in partnership with Reclamation District 2035. This agency will oversee the construction and management of the facility that will pump water from the Sacramento River to the two cities. This new facility is to provide reliable water supply, improve the water quality for drinking purposes, and improve the treated wastewater discharge from the two cities. This new facility is expected to be supplying the cities with clean surface water in June 2016.

== History ==
=== Current water source ===
Woodland and Davis both rely 100 percent on ground water. Wells typically have a life span of thirty to forty years. Woodland has nineteen wells scattered about the city, twelve of which are thirty years old or older. Davis has around twenty-three wells, fourteen that are thirty years old or older. This water infrastructure was introduced in the 1950s and was adequate at the time of implementation, but now is not able to meet state and federal water regulations.

Several wells in Woodland and Davis have been shut down because of water quality issues and aging. Water in these areas have high salinity content, which then becomes recycled into the surface and ground water and impacts the environment. The water also has high levels of hexavalent chromium (Cr6) which is a tasteless and odorless metal. The state permits 10 parts per billion, where as Woodland tests 22 parts per billion. With the growing population, groundwater will not fulfill the demand for water in these locations.

=== Obtaining water rights ===
Water rights were established in the early 1900s and may be purchased from someone who has either riparian or appropriative rights. The agency obtained water rights from the Conway Preservation Group, who had riparian water rights. Conway signed over their riparian property for $2.6 Million dollars upfront in 2016 and each year thereafter with a two percent increase over the next 24 years. After 24 years, the cities will then own the land. The agency also acquired a water permit from the State Water Resource Control Board. Permit 20281 allows water to be diverted from the Sacramento River at monthly rates up to 80 cubic-feet per second, at an annual rate up to 45,000 acre-feet a year.

== Construction ==
=== Builders ===
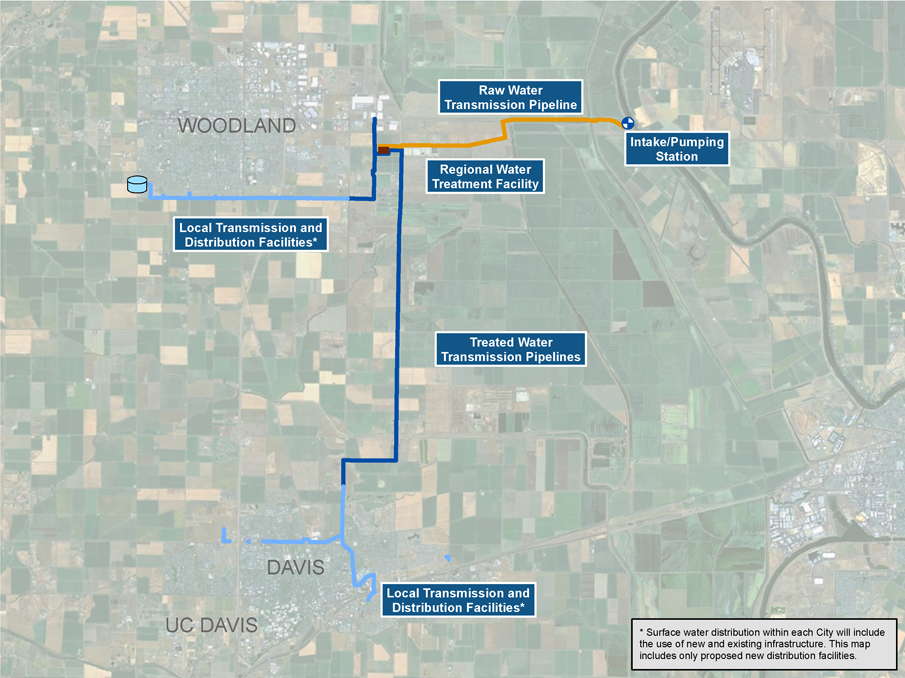
Location of the intake

The WDCWA awarded Colorado based company CH2M Hill, which is a full service consulting company that will design, build, operate, and maintain the facility (DBO), a $141 million contract. This contract includes the joint intake station, pipelines to the new treatment facility, pipelines to Davis and Woodland once water is treated, and improve the cities supply systems. CH2M is a global company that operates specifically within the environmental sector concentrating in water, energy, transportation. DN tanks was also involved in the project and was responsible for the structural design and construction of two 2.8MG AWWA D110 Prestressed Concrete tanks to serve as clearwells at the plant.

=== Intake and facility specifics ===
This facility will use flash mixing, sand ballasted clarification, ozonation, gradual media filtration, and chlorine addition.

The intake station is a reinforced-concrete structure approximately 46 feet tall from the river bottom. The structure will span approximately 200 feet along the river face. There will be ten individual fish screen panels each being 10 feet high by 14 feet wide made from durable stainless steel.

Because water will be transferred to two cities, the water will be pumped at the intake station to an open canal a short distance away and will then be delivered through pipelines to the cities.

=== Expectations of water service ===
This new facility is expected to reach more than two-thirds of the urban population in Yolo, Co along with UC Davis, whom is also a project partner. The water treatment facility will supply 30 million gallons per day, which will be 18 million gallons per day to woodland and 12 million gallons per day to Davis. The facility will also irrigate 15,000 acres of crops for agriculture.

The intake along the Sacramento River will divert 45,000 acre-feet a year (depending on rainfall). This will be regulated by the state during summer and dry months (from the water permit from the State Water Resource Control Board). The water purchase from Conway Farms, which had a senior water right, will allow 10,000 acre-feet to be pumped during the summer months and has fewer regulations during April-October. There will be no added fluoride to the water supply.

Both Woodland and Davis will raise utility fees to help cover some of the costs for the project. Woodland will see 17 percent increase in their water bills and will gradually go up over the next three years.

== Environmental benefits ==
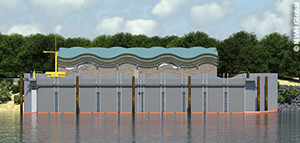
Fish screens on the new intake facility

Clean and reliable water was at the forefront of this deal, but the current environmental impacts of the old intake station were the main concern for many environmental agencies. The fish screens were an important factor in building the new intake station and were required by state agencies. The state granted the WDCWA $2 million to incorporate those fish screens as well as the California Department of Fish and Wildlife, who awarded the agency $8.1 million for the screens as well. These screens will protect the fish, many of which are listed on Endangered Species Act.

As said before, water in Woodland and Davis contains a high salinity content and is recycled thought the water system. A 2009 annual average wastewater discharge flows and discharge water quality showed 80,000 pounds of salt per day being discharged into local watersheds from the two cities. This eventually connects to the delta. This new facility will prevent this runoff into the river by 48 percent.
