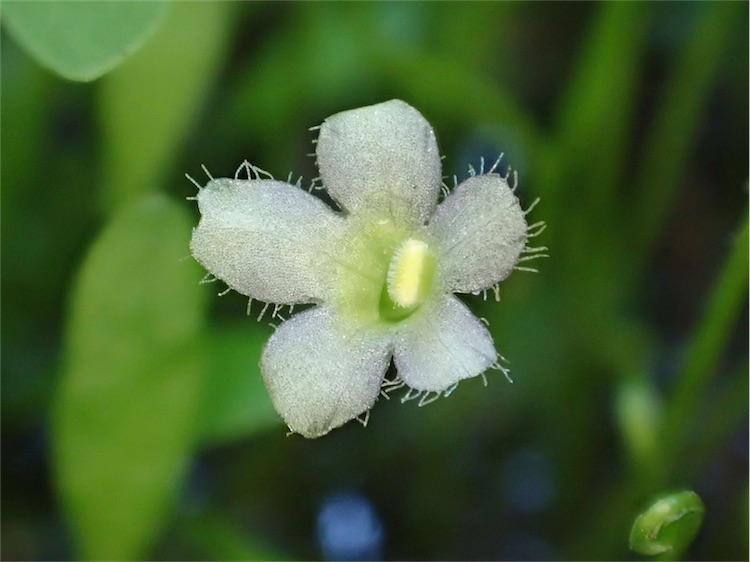

Scientific classification
- Kingdom: Plantae
- Clade: Tracheophytes
- Clade: Angiosperms
- Clade: Eudicots
- Clade: Asterids
- Order: Lamiales
- Family: Phrymaceae
- Genus: Glossostigma
- Species: G. elatinoides

Binomial name
- Glossostigma elatinoides (Benth.) Hook.f.

= Glossostigma elatinoides =

Small mud-mat

Species of aquatic plant

Glossostigma elatinoides, also known as small mud-mat, is a flowering plant in the family Phrymaceae and grows in eastern states of Australia. It is a small aquatic or terrestrial herb with mauve flowers.

== Description ==
Glossostigma elatinoides is a terrestrial or aquatic, perennial, mat-forming herb. The leaves are green, occasionally sparsely hairy, 6–20 mm (0.24–0.79 in) long, 1–3 mm (0.039–0.118 in) wide, elliptic to egg-shaped, base narrows abruptly or gradually into the 2–10 mm (0.079–0.394 in) long, sometimes whitish petiole and a distinct mid vein on lower surface. The corolla is two-lipped, blue-mauve, 2–3.5 mm (0.079–0.138 in) long, pedicels upright, 1–12 mm (0.039–0.472 in) long, calyx 1.5–2.3 mm (0.059–0.091 in) long and green. Flowering occurs from December to May and the fruit is an oval-shaped capsule.

== Taxonomy ==
The species was first described in 1846 by George Bentham who gave it the name Tricholoma elatinoides. In 1853 Joseph Dalton Hooker changed the name to Glossostigma elatinoides and the description was published in The botany of the Antarctic voyage of H.M. discovery ships Erebus and Terror. II. Flora Novae-Zelandiae.

== Distribution and habitat ==
Small mud-mat grows in wet situations on river flats, near swamps and dams in New South Wales, Victoria, South Australia, Tasmania and the Australian Capital Territory.
