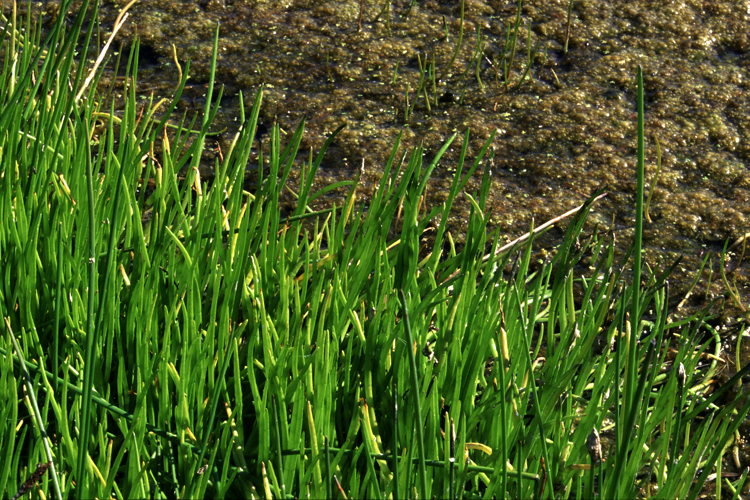
- Lilaeopsis occidentalis

Scientific classification
- Kingdom: Plantae
- Clade: Tracheophytes
- Clade: Angiosperms
- Clade: Eudicots
- Clade: Asterids
- Order: Apiales
- Family: Apiaceae
- Subfamily: Apioideae
- Tribe: Oenantheae
- Genus: Lilaeopsis; Greene

Species
- See text

= Lilaeopsis =

Genus of flowering plants

Lilaeopsis (the grassworts or microswords) is a genus of aquatic and riparian flowering plants in the umbel family Apiaceae (carrots, celery, fennel, parsley, etc), which earns them the common name 'water umbels'. Lilaeopsis are primarily found along the Pacific coast of the Americas, from southern Alaska to Tierra del Fuego and southern Patagonia, as well as the Falkland Islands and some Caribbean and Oceanic islands (mainland Australia, New Zealand and Tasmania). One species, L. mauritiana, is found on the Indian Ocean islands of Madagascar and Mauritius.

The species L. minor (synonymous with L. brasiliensis, and often referred to as 'microsword' or 'Brazilian microsword') is somewhat common in the aquascaping hobby, as its grass-like appearance and creeping growth habit are valued as a groundcover plant for the foreground of aquaria. It is easily cultivated, being commercially produced and sold via tissue culture. The entire genus grows best in a rich, organic substrate (such as dirt or commercial aquasoil), as opposed to simply sand or gravel, and will prefer planting in well-aerated water with natural lighting, or medium to high artificial lighting; additionally, like many aquarium plants, carbon dioxide (CO_{2}) supplementation will improve their overall health and vigor, though may not be necessary with a nutritious, organic substrate.

== Species list ==
There are currently 12 accepted species of Lilaeopsis.

- Lilaeopsis attenuata (Hook. & Arn.) Fernald — SE Brazil, NE Argentina to Uruguay.
- Lilaeopsis brisbanica (A.R. Bean) — Queensland.
- Lilaeopsis carolinensis (J.M. Coult. & Rose), 'Carolina grasswort' – southern U.S. & Central America to Argentina.
- Lilaeopsis chinensis (L.) Kunzte, 'Eastern grasswort' — Eastern Canada to SE Texas.
- Lilaeopsis mauritiana (G. Petersen & Affolter) — Madagascar and Mauritius.
- Lilaeopsis minor (A.W. Hill) Pérez-Mor., 'Microsword' (syn. with L. brasiliensis) — SE Brazil to Argentina.
- Lilaeopsis novae-zelandiae (Gand.) A.W. Hill — Tasmania and South Island, New Zealand.
- Lilaeopsis occidentalis (J.M. Coult. & Rose), 'Western grasswort' — widespread across the Americas; from Alaska, Pacific NW and U.S. West Coast to Colombia, Ecuador, Perú, Chile, Falkland Islands.
  - Lilaeopsis masonii – 'Mudflat quillplant' (former taxon—now synonymous with L.occidentalis)
- Lilaeopsis polyantha (Gand.) H. Eichler, 'Creeping Crantzia' — SE Queensland, Victoria, South and West Australia.
- Lilaeopsis ruthiana (Affolter) — New Zealand.
- Lilaeopsis schaffneriana (Schltdl.) J.M. Coult. & Rose, 'Schaffner’s grasswort' — Arizona, Mexico, the Caribbean, W South America.
- Lilaeopsis tenuis (A.W. Hill) — Southern Brazil.
