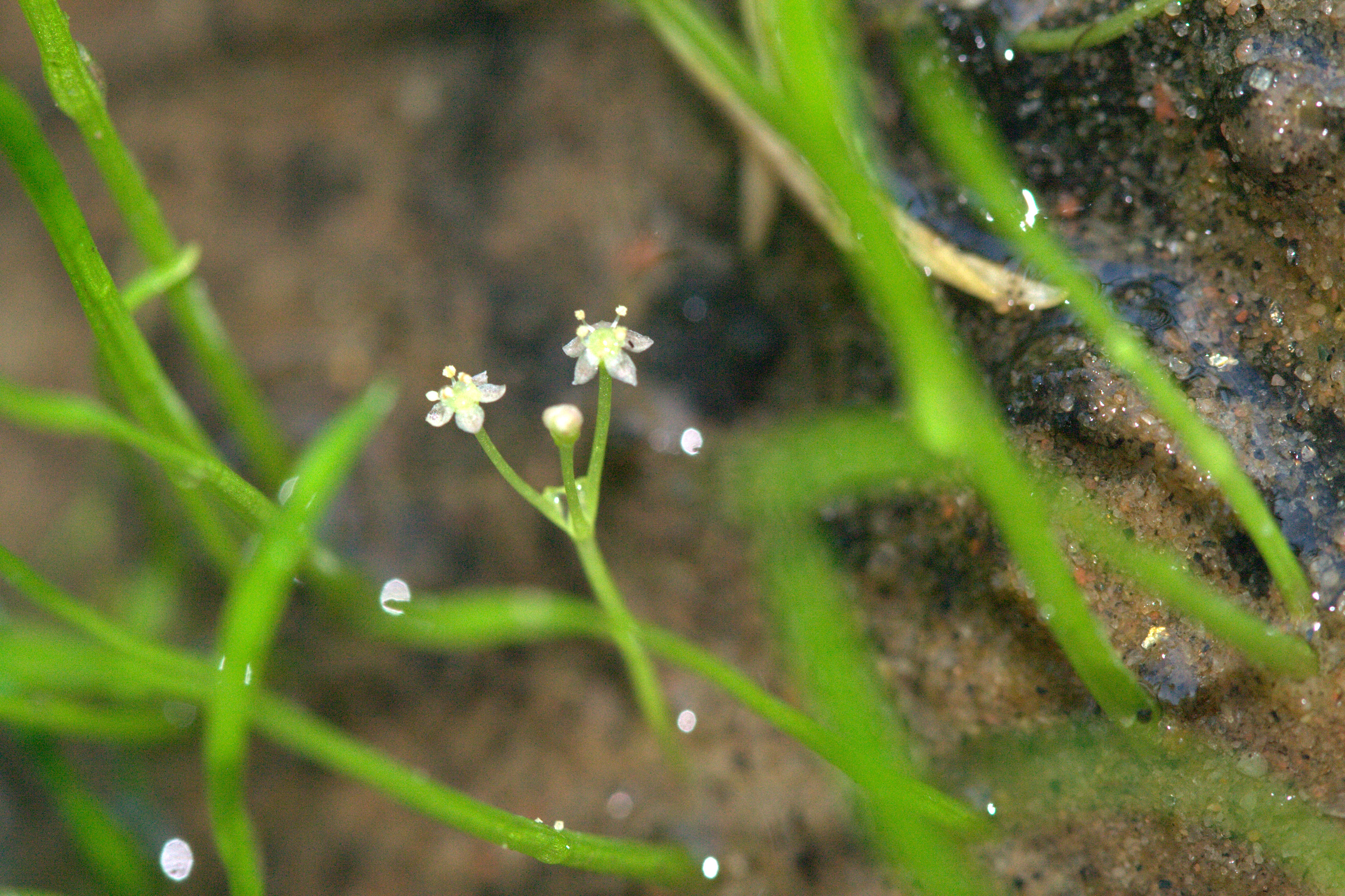
- Flowers of Lilaeopsis brasiliensis

Scientific classification
- Kingdom: Plantae
- Clade: Tracheophytes
- Clade: Angiosperms
- Clade: Eudicots
- Clade: Asterids
- Order: Apiales
- Family: Apiaceae
- Genus: Lilaeopsis
- Species: L. brasiliensis

Binomial name
- Lilaeopsis brasiliensis Affolter (1985)

= Lilaeopsis brasiliensis =

Species of aquatic plant

Lilaeopsis brasiliensis is a plant species in the family Apiaceae.

== Common names ==
Micro sword.

== Synonyms ==
Craztzia brasiliensis Commonly sold as L. novae-zelandiae - a true species from New Zealand but it doesn't yet seem to have been introduced into the aquarium trade.

== Origins ==
Found in South America.

== Description ==
A short-stemmed plant with pale green leaves that in the right conditions form a short carpet. Reaches a height of about 1.5 - 3 inches (4 - 7 cm).

== Cultivation ==
Used in the foreground of the aquarium. To grow well it needs a very bright light, and a tropical temperature range. It prefers a good substrate, a nutrient rich water and will benefit from additional CO_{2}. According to Tropica it will tolerate some salt in the water. Slow growing.

Propagates from runners which are readily formed but it can take some time to form the mat effect desired in planted aquariums.
