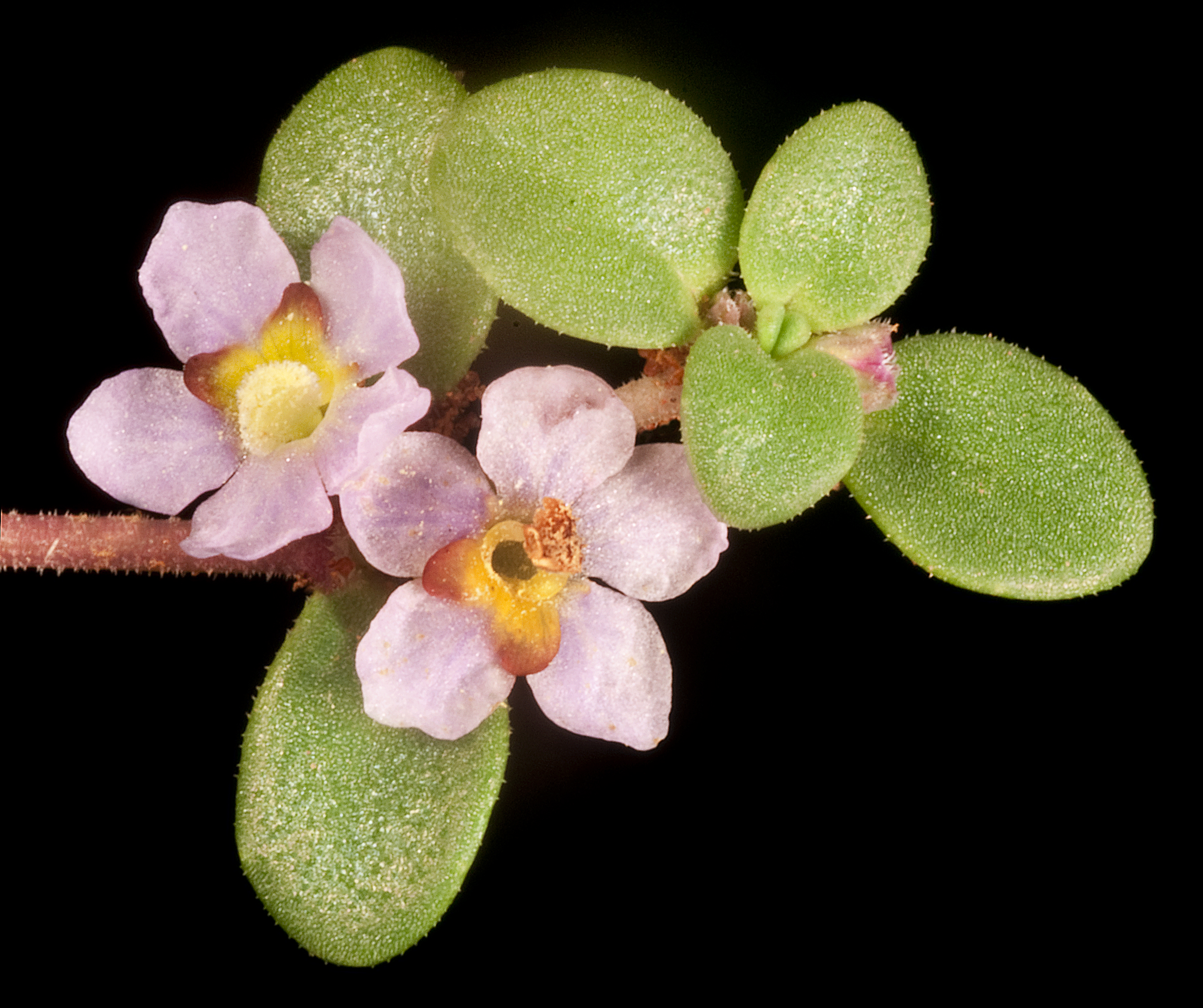

Scientific classification
- Kingdom: Plantae
- Clade: Tracheophytes
- Clade: Angiosperms
- Clade: Eudicots
- Clade: Asterids
- Order: Lamiales
- Family: Phrymaceae
- Genus: Glossostigma; Wight & Arn., 1836

Species
- 6, see text.

Synonyms
- Peltimela Raf.; Tricholoma Benth.

= Glossostigma =

Genus of flowering plants

Glossostigma is a genus of flowering plants in the lopseed family, Phrymaceae.

== Species ==
There are six accepted species:

- Glossostigma cleistanthum W.R.Barker
- Glossostigma diandrum (L.) Kuntze
- Glossostigma drummondii Benth.
- Glossostigma elatinoides (Benth.) Hook.f.
- Glossostigma submersum Petrie
- Glossostigma trichodes F.Muell.
