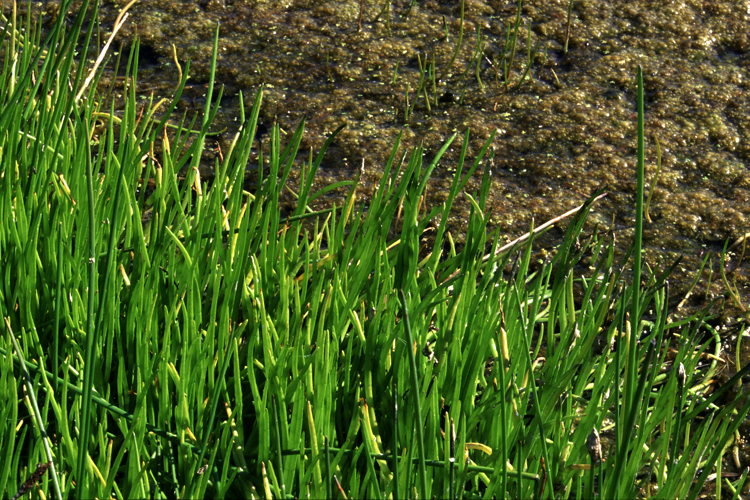

Scientific classification
- Kingdom: Plantae
- Clade: Tracheophytes
- Clade: Angiosperms
- Clade: Eudicots
- Clade: Asterids
- Order: Apiales
- Family: Apiaceae
- Genus: Lilaeopsis
- Species: L. occidentalis

Binomial name
- Lilaeopsis occidentalis J.M.Coult. & Rose

= Lilaeopsis occidentalis =

Species of aquatic plant

Lilaeopsis occidentalis is a species of flowering plant in the family Apiaceae known by the common name western grasswort. It is native to the coastline western North America from far southern Alaska to California, where it grows in brackish and salt marshes. This is a perennial herb producing a tuft of thready but stiff and erect grasslike leaves up to about 30 centimeters long from a rhizome network. The minute flowers are located in an umbel on a short stalk. They yield tiny round fruits only 1 or 2 millimeters wide.
