= Decker Island =

Island in California

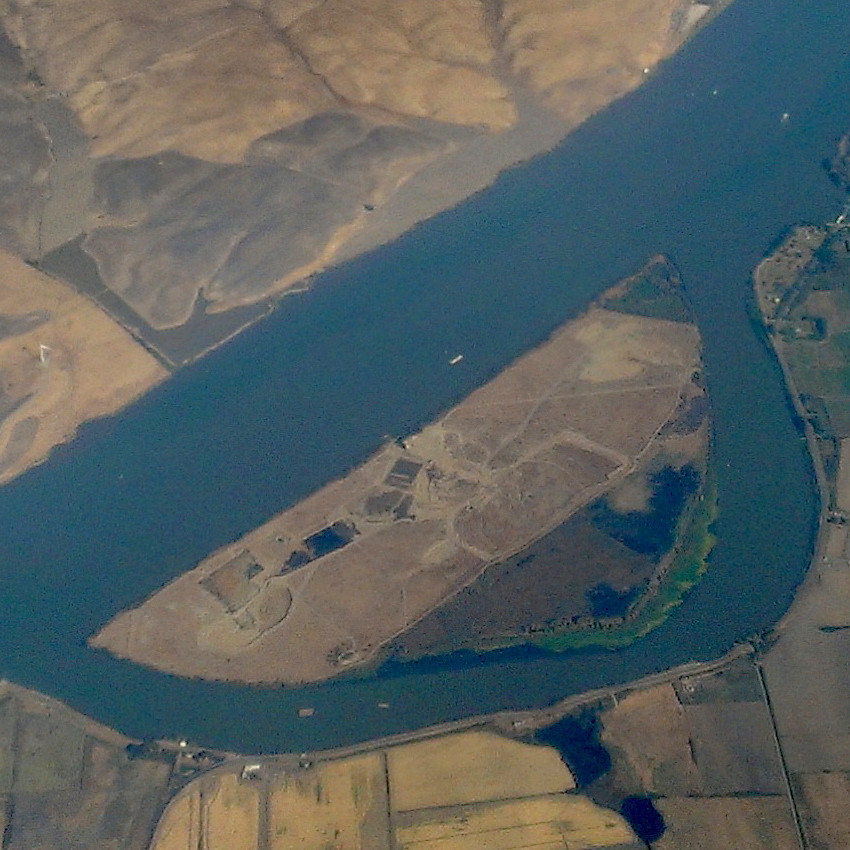
- An aerial photograph taken looking north in 2015. Sherman Island is below it.

- Location within Sacramento-San Joaquin River Delta Location within San Francisco Bay Area Location within California Location within the United States

Geography
- Location: Northern California
- Coordinates: 38.0904745°N 121.7191214°W
- Adjacent to: Sacramento–San Joaquin River Delta

Administration
- United States
- State: California
- County: Solano

Decker Island is a small island in the Sacramento-San Joaquin River delta, in California. It is part of Solano County. Its coordinates are 38.0904745°N 121.7191214°W. Part of the island is the Decker Island Wildlife Area, operated by the California Department of Fish and Wildlife.
