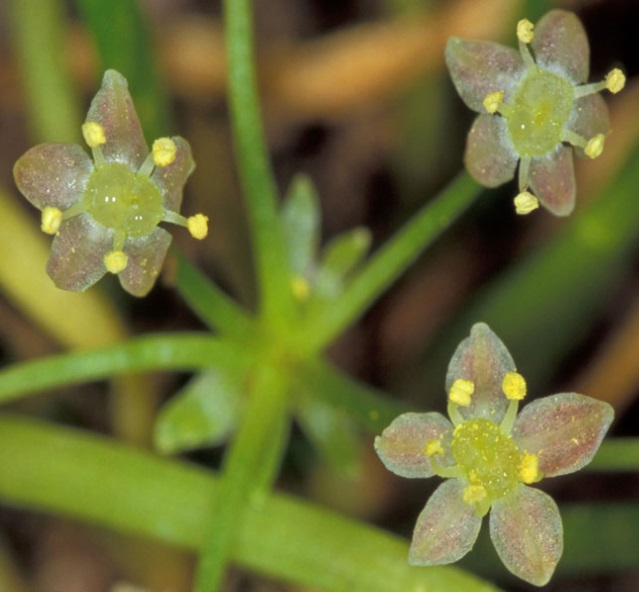
- subsp. recurva

Conservation status
- Apparently Secure (NatureServe)

Scientific classification
- Kingdom: Plantae
- Clade: Tracheophytes
- Clade: Angiosperms
- Clade: Eudicots
- Clade: Asterids
- Order: Apiales
- Family: Apiaceae
- Genus: Lilaeopsis
- Species: L. schaffneriana

Binomial name
- Lilaeopsis schaffneriana (Schltdl.) J.M.Coult. & Rose

Subspecies
- L. s. subsp. recurva (A.W.Hill) Affolter; L. s. subsp. schaffneriana (autonym)

Synonyms
- Crantzia schaffneriana Schltdl. (basionym); C. s. fo. aquatica Schltdl.; C. s. fo. subterrestris Schltdl.; Crantziola schaffneriana Koso-Pol.; Lilaeopsis recurva A.W.Hill [ = L. schaffneriana subsp. recurva ]; L. schaffneriana var. aquatica (Schltdl.) A.W.Hill; L. s. var. subterrestris A.W.Hill

= Lilaeopsis schaffneriana =

Species of flowering plant

Lilaeopsis schaffneriana is a rare species of flowering plant in the family Apiaceae known by the common names Schaffner's grasswort and cienega false rush.

- Lilaeopsis schaffneriana subsp. schaffneriana is found in Bolivia, Colombia, Cuba, Dominican Republic, Ecuador, and Mexico (in the Federal District and the following states: Chihuahua, Coahuila, Durango, Hidalgo, Jalisco, México, Michoacán, Nuevo León, Oaxaca, Puebla, San Luis Potosí, and Tlaxcala).
- Lilaeopsis schaffneriana subsp. recurva (Huachuca water umbel), is a federally listed endangered species (status G4T2, imperiled) of the United States. It is limited to desert wetlands, including a rare type of desert marsh habitat called a cienega. There are 8 populations in Arizona and four more south of the border in Mexico.

== Conservation ==
The species is extremely reliant on water level for its survival.
