= West Island (California) =

Island in California

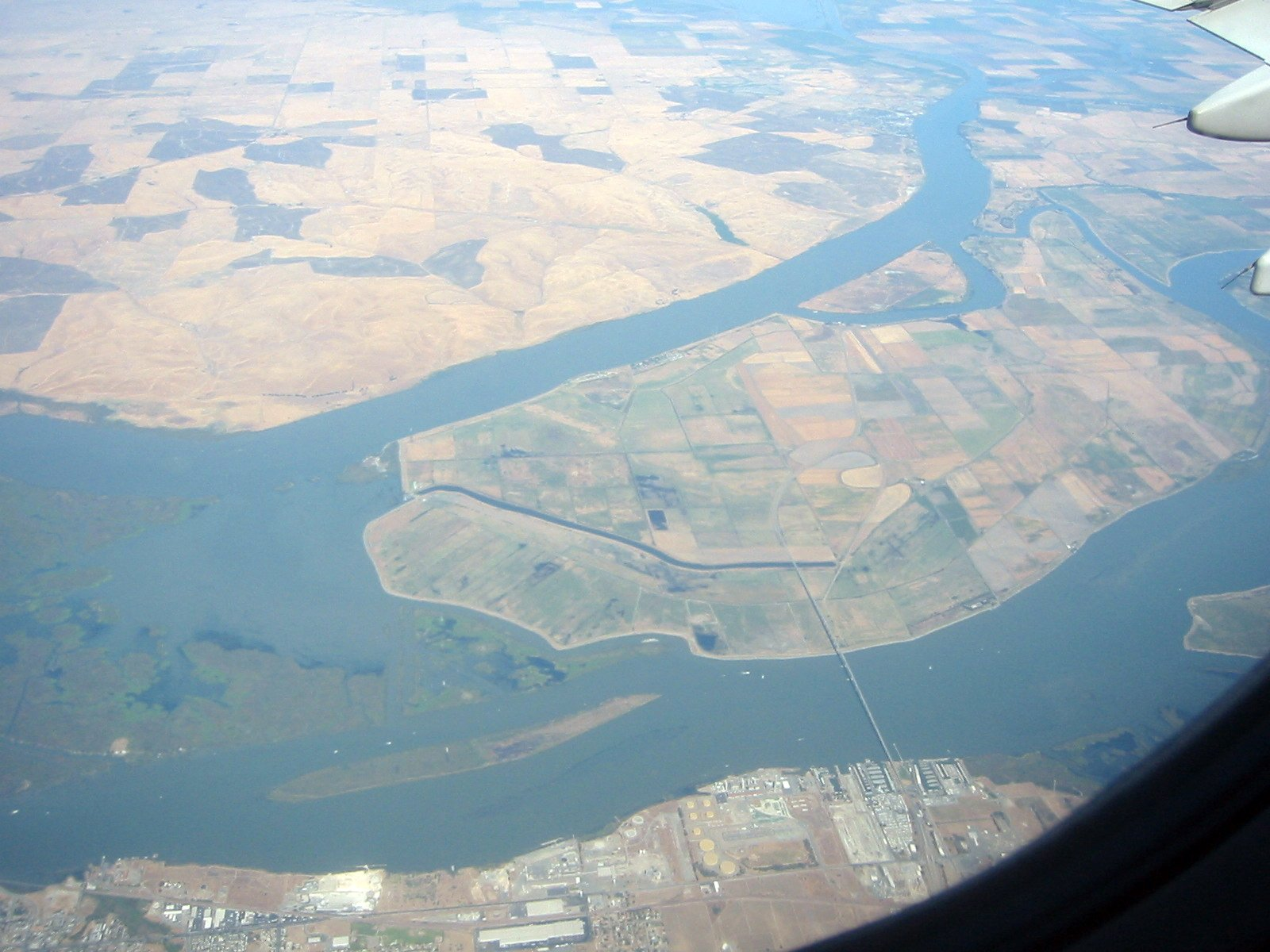
- West Island is the long, thin island in the bottom left of this photo. The larger island is Sherman Island, and the bridge goes down to Antioch.

- Location within Sacramento-San Joaquin River Delta Location within San Francisco Bay Area Location within California Location within the United States

Geography
- Location: Northern California
- Coordinates: 38°01′24″N 121°46′43″W
- Adjacent to: San Joaquin River

Administration
- United States
- State: California
- County: Sacramento

West Island is a small island in the San Joaquin River, California. It is part of Sacramento County. Its coordinates are 38°01′24″N 121°46′43″W. It is shown, labeled "Webers Island", on an 1850 survey map of the San Francisco Bay area made by Cadwalader Ringgold and an 1854 map of the area by Henry Lange.
