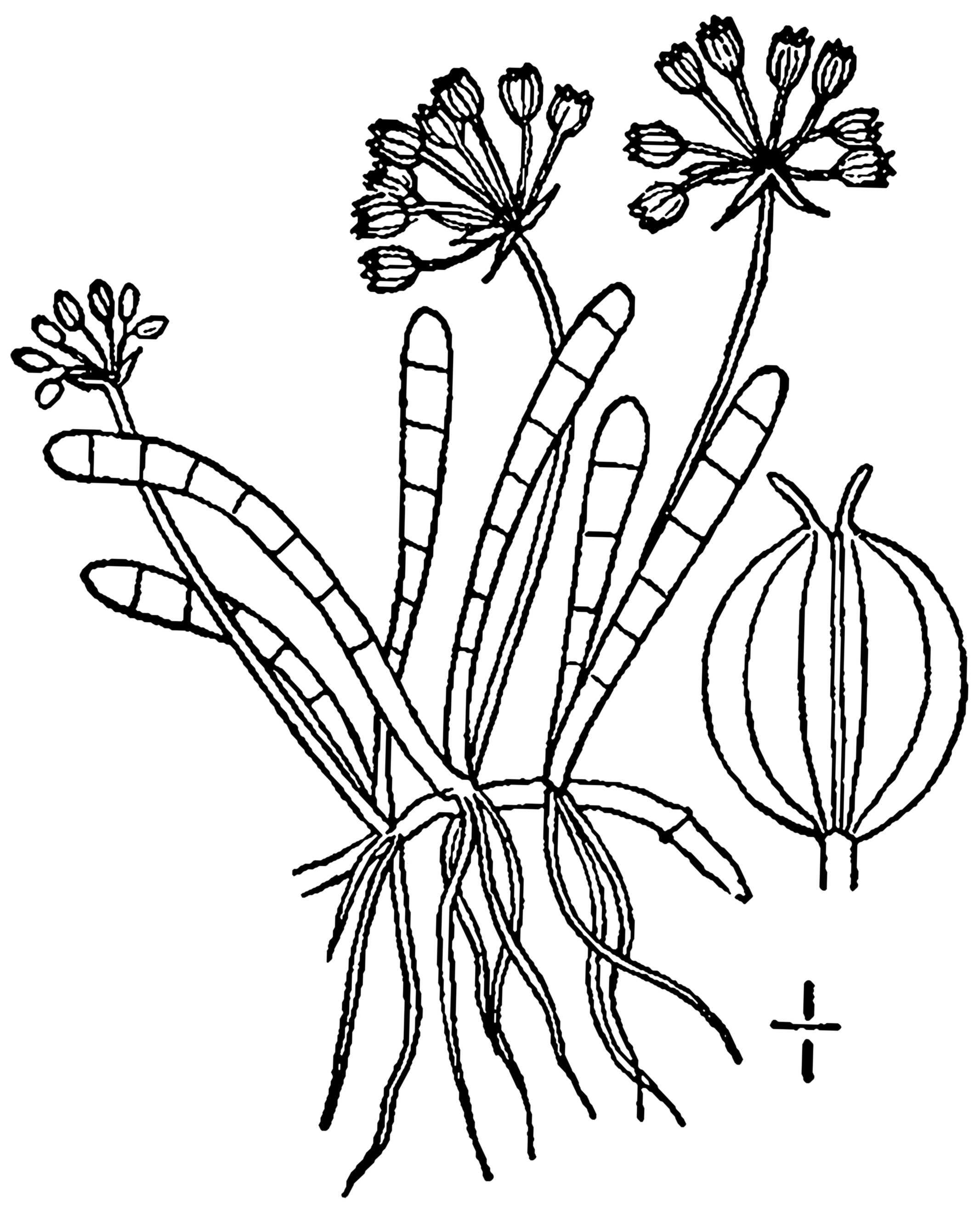
- Botanical illustration of Lilaeopsis chinensis

Scientific classification
- Kingdom: Plantae
- Clade: Tracheophytes
- Clade: Angiosperms
- Clade: Eudicots
- Clade: Asterids
- Order: Apiales
- Family: Apiaceae
- Genus: Lilaeopsis
- Species: L. chinensis

Binomial name
- Lilaeopsis chinensis (L.) Kuntze

Synonyms
- Lilaeopsis lineata

= Lilaeopsis chinensis =

Species of flowering plant

Lilaeopsis chinensis, common names eastern grasswort, eastern lilaeopsis, marsh lilaeopsis, and lilaeopsis, is a plant that is native to North America.

== Conservation status ==
It is listed as threatened in Maine, New Hampshire, and New York, as a special concern in Connecticut, and as having a historic range in Rhode Island.
