= Lilaeopsis masonii =

Conservation status
- Imperiled (NatureServe)

Scientific classification
- Kingdom: Plantae
- Clade: Tracheophytes
- Clade: Angiosperms
- Clade: Eudicots
- Clade: Asterids
- Order: Apiales
- Family: Apiaceae
- Genus: Lilaeopsis
- Species: L. masonii

Binomial name
- Lilaeopsis masonii Mathias & Constance

Species of aquatic plant

Lilaeopsis masonii is a species of flowering plant in the family Apiaceae known by the common names mudflat quillplant and Mason's lilaeopsis. It is endemic to California, where it is known only from the Sacramento-San Joaquin River Delta and nearby shores of San Francisco Bay.

It is a plant of freshwater and brackish marshes and other estuary habitat. The plant is rare overall, limited in distribution to about 80 populations in a single network of water bodies, but it is locally abundant in some areas. It is a common bayside plant in Suisun Marsh.

It is threatened by numerous environmental factors, however, including erosion, flood control activities such as levee maintenance and dredging, consumption of marshland for development, agriculture, recreation, pollution, and competition with water hyacinth (Eichhornia crassipes).

This is a small perennial herb, superficially grasslike in appearance, growing in small continuous tufts from spreading rhizomes. The thready or hairlike leaves are several centimeters high and green in color. The inflorescence is a minute, threadlike umbel of tiny greenish white to maroon flowers each yielding a spherical fruit about a millimeter wide.
