= Browns Island (Contra Costa County) =

Island in Pittsburg, California

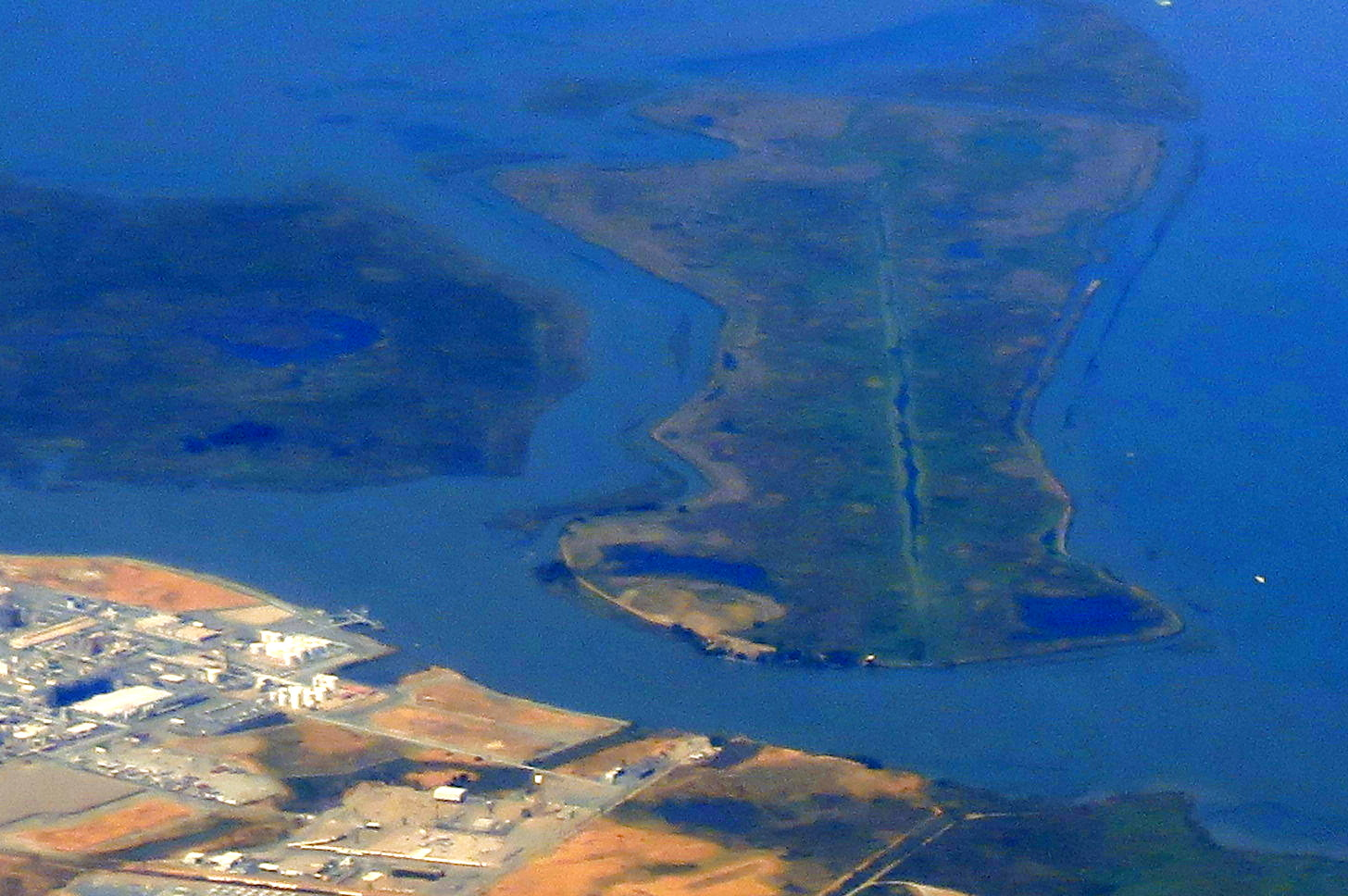
- An aerial photo of Browns Island (on the left). Winter Island is on the right of the image, and Antioch is on the bottom.

- Location within Sacramento-San Joaquin River Delta Location within San Francisco Bay Area Location within California Location within the United States

Geography
- Location: Suisun Bay
- Coordinates: 38.03881°N 121.86468°W
- Area: 595 acres (241 ha)
- Highest elevation: 0 m (0 ft)

Administration
- United States
- U.S. state: California
- County: Contra Costa County
- City: Pittsburg

Demographics
- Population: 0

Browns Island (also Gwin Island or Brown Island) is a regional preserve of the East Bay Regional Park District (EBRPD) in Pittsburg, Contra Costa County, California, United States. It is an island in Suisun Bay, part of the Sacramento-San Joaquin River Delta, (Note: Browns Island is at the confluence of these two rivers.) separated from the rest of Pittsburg by New York Slough.

The 595-acre (241 ha) island is separated from Winter Island to the east by Middle Slough, and bounded by New York Slough on the south and Suisun Bay on the west and northwest. It is shown, labeled "Gwin Island", on an 1850 survey map of the San Francisco Bay area made by Cadwalader Ringgold and an 1854 map of the area by Henry Lange.

The East Bay Regional Park District has published a guide to the wild plants that grow on this island. The island is home to six rare and endangered plant species, and a variety of aquatic birds.

== See also ==
- List of islands of California
