= Winter Island (California) =

Restored as a tidal marsh in Suisun Bay

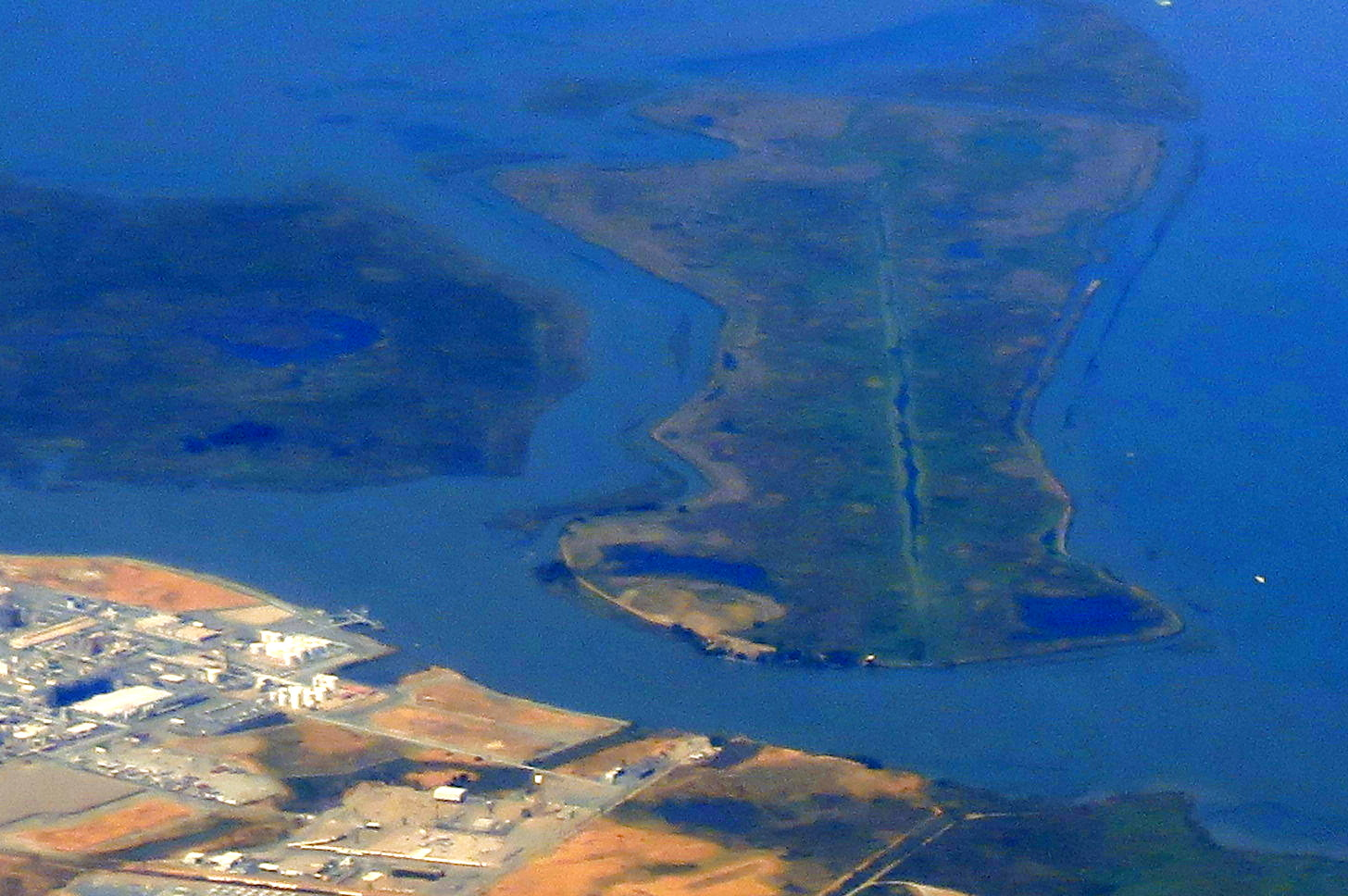
- An aerial photo of Winter Island (on the right). Browns Island is on the left of the image, and Antioch is on the bottom.

- Location within Sacramento-San Joaquin River Delta Location within San Francisco Bay Area Location within California Location within the United States

Geography
- Location: Suisun Bay
- Coordinates: 38.043°N 121.849°W
- Area: 453 acres (183 ha)
- Highest elevation: 0 m (0 ft)

Administration
- United States
- U.S. state: California
- County: Contra Costa County

Winter Island (also known as Ruckels Island) is a 453-acre (183 ha) island in Suisun Bay, in the western Sacramento-San Joaquin River Delta. It is north of Pittsburg, separated from Browns Island to the west by a slough. It was private property, and contained one house. It is used as a duck hunting area, a wetland, and a dredging disposal area. In 2016 Winter Island was purchased by the California Department of Water Resources in order to restore the island as a tidal marsh. Winter Island is part of Contra Costa County, and managed by Reclamation District 2122. It is shown, labeled "Ruckels Island", on an 1850 survey map of the San Francisco Bay area made by Cadwalader Ringgold and an 1854 map of the area by Henry Lange.

In 2009, Brusco Tug and Barge, a tugboat company, pled guilty to illegal dredge dumping near the island between 2003 and 2007. In 2014, a large wildfire broke out on the island.

== See also ==
- List of islands of California
- Baldwin Deepwater Shipping Channel
- Stockton Deepwater Shipping Channel
- Sacramento Deep Water Ship Channel
