= California Reclamation Districts =

Legal subdivisions

California Reclamation Districts are legal subdivisions within California's Central Valley that are responsible for managing and maintaining the levees, fresh water channels, or sloughs (pronounced slü), canals, pumps, and other flood protection structures in the area. Each is run autonomously and is run by an elected board and funded with taxes to property owners in the local area. The Central Valley Flood Protection Board has the power to determine that a district is not satisfactorily maintaining the structures and causing the California Department of Water Resources to declare an area as a maintenance area.

== History ==
A reclamation district represents former wetlands that were drained for agriculture. The reclamation districts were created by acts of State Legislature, mostly in the early 1900s in order to allow land to be used for agriculture. For example, Reclamation District No. 1000 was created on April 8, 1911. Reclamation was usually accomplished by the introduction of levee systems along with other flood control mechanisms to prevent flooding in wetland areas. The levees also enabled large amounts of silt runoff from gold mining to be channeled all the way out to the San Francisco Bay area, even at water levels that would normally flood the banks and therefore move too slowly for sediment transport.

Most of the structures were built as part of the Central Valley Project authorized by congress in 1917 and ultimately finished in 1960 by the US Army Corps of Engineers. There are about 1,600 miles (2,600 km) of project levees as well as many pumps, canals, sloughs, bypasses and other flood protection structures which became the responsibility of the State of California in 1960. In total, there are around 13,000 miles (21,000 km) of levees (if the non-project levees are included) in the State of California. Non-project levees are the levees which do not fall under the auspices of the state government and are considered the responsibility of the individual land owners. The vast majority of the water in the California watershed (or drainage basin) falls into the central valley area which drains into the Sacramento–San Joaquin River Delta, and so this is also where most of the levee systems and reclamation districts fall.

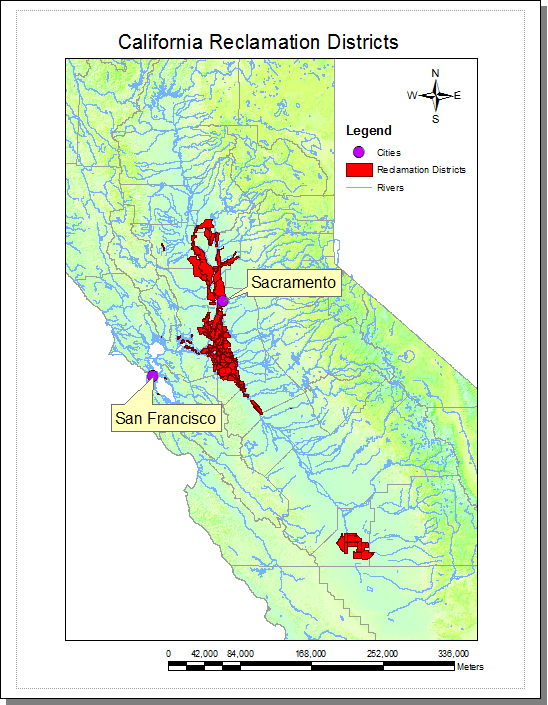

== See also ==
- Folsom Dam
