= Sherman Island (California) =

Island in California

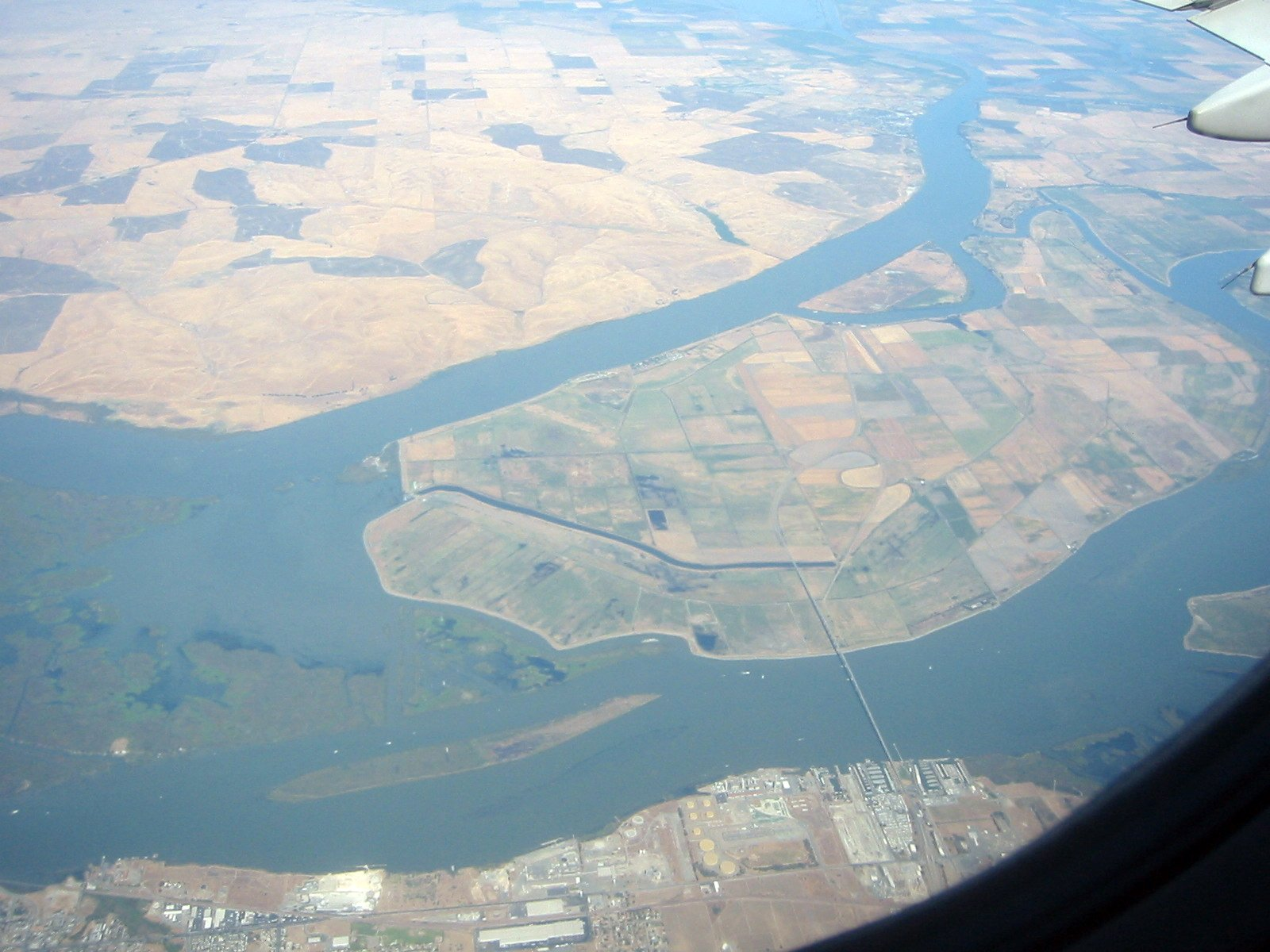
- Sherman Island from the air. The bridge at bottom connects it to Antioch. The small D-shaped island at the top right is Decker Island.

- Location within Sacramento-San Joaquin River Delta Location within San Francisco Bay Area Location within California

Geography
- Location: Sacramento–San Joaquin River Delta
- Coordinates: 38°03′34″N 121°44′00″W
- Adjacent to: Sacramento-San Joaquin River Delta
- Area: 14,000 acres (5,700 ha)
- Length: 9.5 mi (15.3 km) measured SW–NE
- Width: 3.0 mi (4.8 km) measured SE–NW

Demographics
- Population: 233 (2000)

Additional information
- Official website: www.regionalparks.saccounty.net/Parks/SacramentoRiverandDelta/Pages/ShermanIsland.aspx

Sherman Island is an island in the Sacramento-San Joaquin River Delta at the confluence of the two rivers in Sacramento County, California, 1.2 miles (1.9 km) northeast of Antioch. The 5,500 ha (14,000 acres) island, mostly managed by Reclamation District 341, is the meeting point of Sacramento, Solano, and Contra Costa Counties, and is bordered on the north and northwest by the Sacramento River, on the northeast by Three Mile Slough, and on the east, and south west by the San Joaquin River. Sherman Island is a widely known kite and windsurfing area.

Sherman Island was shown, in the same location but with a different shape, on an 1850 survey map of the San Francisco Bay area made by Cadwalader Ringgold and an 1854 map of the area by Henry Lange. Currently, it is 10 feet below sea level, due to the drainage of wetlands in the Delta which has dried out its peat soils, resulting in land subsidence. "In ... parts of Sherman Island, the land has now subsided 25 feet since the late 1800s—and continues to sink between half an inch and 1.5 inches yearly." It is possible that simultaneous levee failures on Sherman Island and surrounding islands, occurring in the wake of an earthquake, could threaten the fresh water supply for the Central Valley.

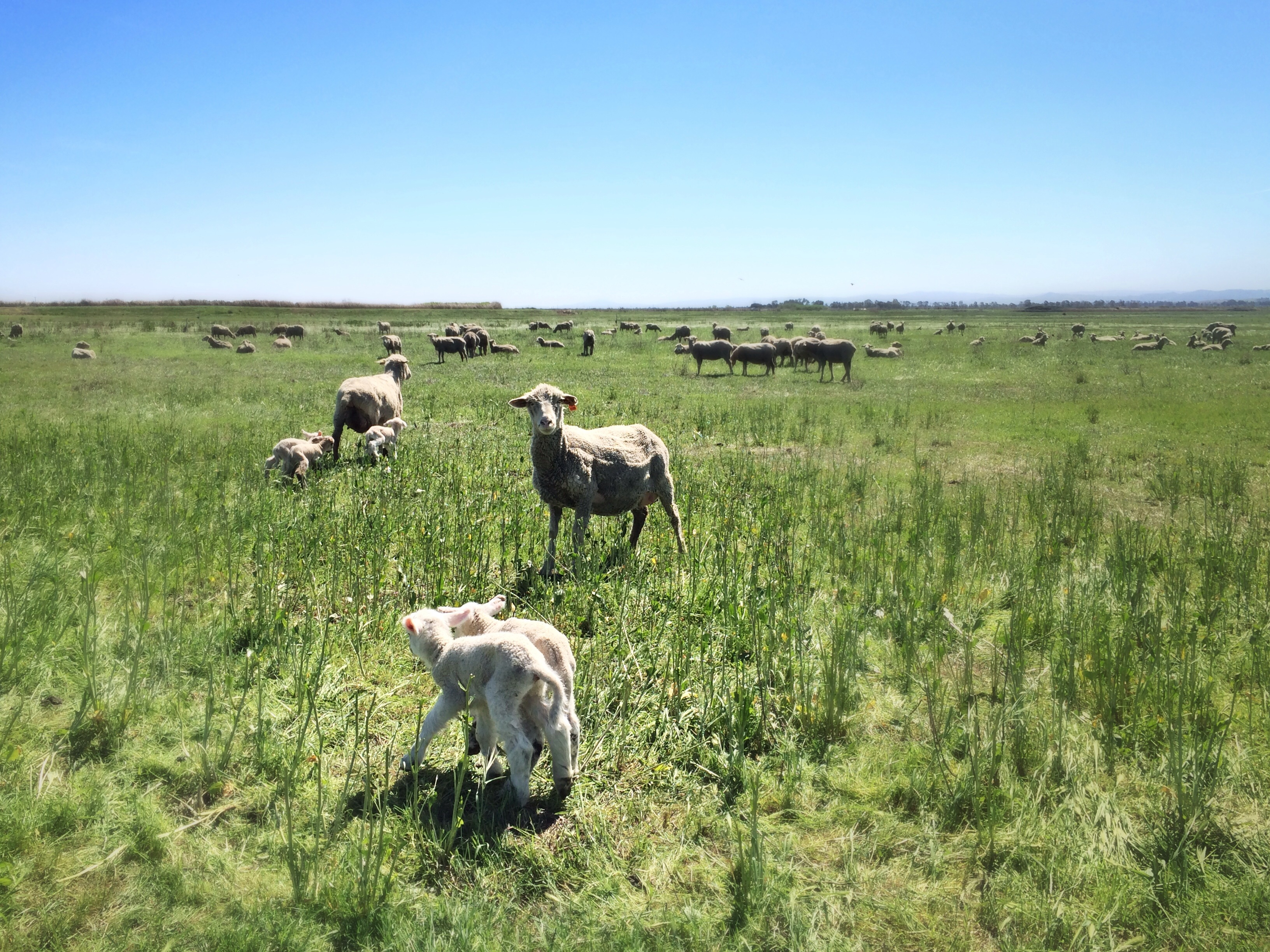
Sheep grazing on Sherman Island, March 2014

== Access ==
Access to the island is provided by boat and from California State Route 160, which uses the Antioch Bridge to link Sherman Island with the city of Antioch to the south, and the Three Mile Slough Bridge to link Sherman Island with Brannan Island State Recreation Area to the north. In either case, turn south onto Sherman Island Road and continue driving to Mayberry Slough.

== Wildlife area ==
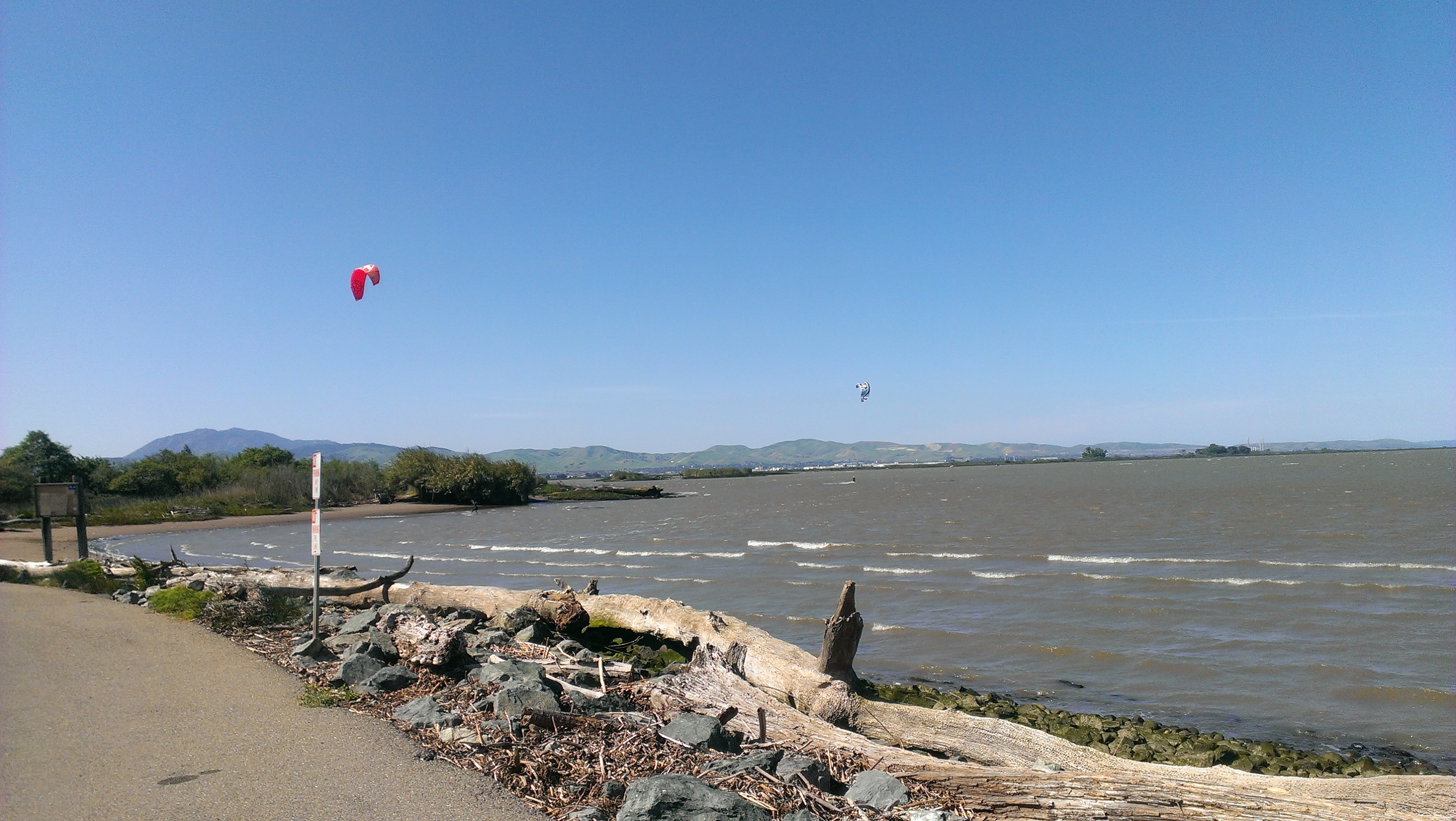
Kiteboarding at Sherman Island, California, April, 2015.

The southwest of the island, known as Lower Sherman Island Wildlife Area, contains about 3,100 acres (1,300 ha) and features a large marshy area and Sherman Lake where there is fish (Note: Fishing primarily yields: salmon, steelhead, striped bass and sturgeon.) and other water sports, particularly windsurfing and kiteboarding. This area was designated in 1976 as a wildlife habitat by the California Fish & Game Commission. The Delta Flood Protection Act, enacted after serious flooding occurred in 1986, included flood control improvement projects for Sherman Island, as well as eight other islands. Senate Bill 1065, enacted in 1991, was intended to assure that these islands did not experience any net loss of habitat.

== Hours and fees ==
In 2019, park hours were established as sunrise to sunset year-round. Self-payment is required when no fee collector is present.

=== Camping ===
Overnight camping is allowed with the following restrictions:

- Maximum stay is 14 nights, after which a 30-day break is required.
- Camping with self-contained vehicles only (RV's, trailers and vans)
- Camping is not permitted in the boat launch parking lot
- There is a fee of $35 for nightly camping

=== Entrance fees ===
As of 2026, the entrance fees are:

- $7 per Vehicle
- $13 per Vehicle with Trailer/Oversized Vehicle over 22 feet (6.7 m)
- $28 per Bus

== See also ==
- List of islands of California
