= California Pacific Railroad =

Defunct railroad in California, United States

- Cal. P. R. R. or Cal-P
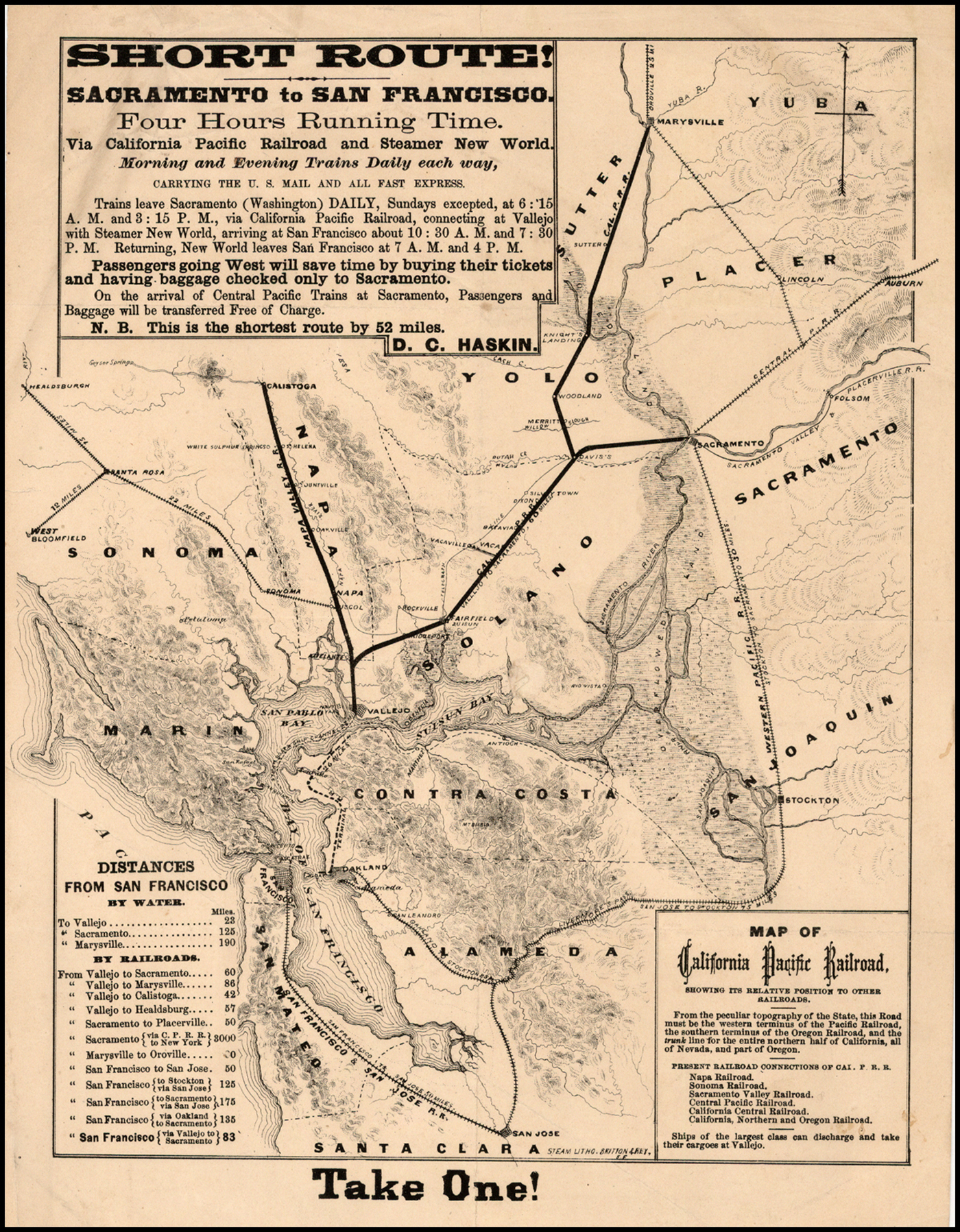

Overview
- Headquarters: San Francisco, California
- Locale: Vallejo - Sacramento - Napa - Calistoga - Davis - Marysville
- Dates of operation: 1865–1876
- Successor: Central Pacific Railroad

Technical
- Track gauge: 4 ft 8 1/2 in (1,435 mm) standard gauge

The California Pacific Railroad Company (abbreviated Cal. P. R. R. or Cal-P) was incorporated in 1865 at San Francisco, California as the California Pacific Rail Road Company. It was renamed the California Pacific Railroad Extension Company in the spring of 1869, then renamed the California Pacific Railroad later that same year. Its main line from Vallejo to Washington, now West Sacramento, was completed November 1868, six months prior to the May 1869 golden spike ceremony of the Central Pacific/Union Pacific Transcontinental Railway.

Beginning January 1869, the company operated a passenger ferryboat (New World) from San Francisco to Vallejo and thence a railroad to West Sacramento. It also had a branch from Adelante (later Napa Junction, now American Canyon) to Calistoga and another from Davis to Marysville. By the end of January 1870, the company was able to span the Sacramento river and operate to and from the city of Sacramento.

The Cal-P operated independently from 1865 to 1876. It was then operated by the Central Pacific and was finally sold to the Southern Pacific.

Amtrak's Capitol Corridor follows the original Cal-P Line from Sacramento to Suisun/Fairfield on its way to, via Martinez, Oakland and San Jose.

== A shorter transcontinental route ==
When the transcontinental railroad first crossed the U.S. in May 1869, it wasn't truly a transcontinental line because it terminated at Sacramento, short of the Pacific coast destination of San Francisco or Oakland Harbor.

The first truly transcontinental railroad was completed September 1869, from Sacramento through Stockton, over Altamont Pass and thence via Niles Canyon to the San Francisco Bay Area, a distance of 120 miles (190 km). That line was constructed by Leland Stanford's Central Pacific Railroad subsidiary, the Western Pacific Railroad (of 1862). The route over Altamont Pass was completed to Alameda Terminal in September 1869 (and to Oakland Long Wharf in November 1869). (Note: This Western Pacific (1862-1870) is unrelated to the Western Pacific Railroad (of 1916) that ran to Salt Lake City via the Feather River Canyon.)

The other route from Sacramento through Stockton, to Banta and Tracey Junction, thence to Martinez to Oakland, completed in 1878, was able to avoid the heavy grades of Altamont Pass, but was 132 miles (212 km), twelve miles longer.

The Central Pacific had been searching for a shorter route from the Bay Area to Sacramento and eyeing the California Pacific (Cal-P) road between Sacramento and Vallejo, completed in November 1868, which became the basis for a Cal-P Vallejo route of about 90 miles (140 km) when steamer ferry service between San Francisco and Vallejo was inaugurated by Cal-P in January 1869.

In July 1871, the Central Pacific offered to buy the Cal-P, but their offer was rejected. Central Pacific announced plans to build a parallel route of the Cal-P but diverging at Napa Junction via the Suisun Marsh to Benicia. In September 1871, Central Pacific gained the majority of its stocks and thus control of the California Pacific. The California Pacific, facing financial and expansion difficulties, finally was sold to the Central Pacific in 1876.

The Central Pacific proceeded to shift from the Cal-P Sacramento to Vallejo mainline in favor of a line diverging at Suisun across the Suisun Marsh to Benicia on the northern shore of Carquinez Strait. In October 1877, Central Pacific began construction of the 17 miles (27 km) of track across the Suisun Marsh to Benicia, but could not complete it until 1879 because of the unstable subgrade through the marsh, which required tons of crushed rock to stabilize the subgrade. A railroad ferry Solano was established in December 1879 to carry entire trains across Carquinez Strait between Benicia and Port Costa, which enabled the transcontinental trains to reach Oakland, California in a much shorter time.

== Historical timeline ==
The California Pacific Railroad Company (Cal. P. R. R. Co.) was established in January 1865 for the purpose of building a railroad from Vallejo to Sacramento, with a branch off to Marysville. Connection between Vallejo and San Francisco was to be made by ferryboats. That same month the Company entered into contract with Dewitt Clinton Haskin to build the entire railroad.

=== Vallejo–Sacramento line ===
The California Pacific commenced construction at South Vallejo (west of the Carquinez Bridge) in December 1866 under the contractor D. C. Haskin. Rails began to be laid on April 10, 1868. Two months after tracklaying began, the track was completed from Vallejo, via Napa Junction and Jameson Pass, to Suisun on June 24, 1868. In August, the tracks reached Davisville (Davis), 14 miles from Sacramento. The main route from Vallejo to the town of Washington, California, across the Sacramento river from the city of Sacramento, was completed November 11, 1868.

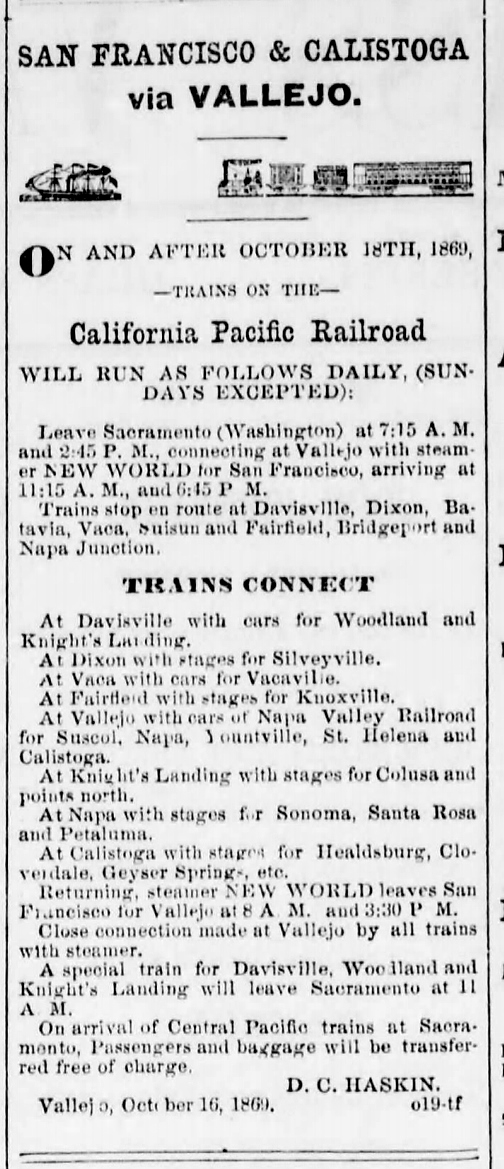
Schedule of the California Pacific Railroad, effective October 18, 1869

The original route of the Cal-P mainline from Suisun to Vallejo is now the route of the California Northern Railroad between Vallejo and Suisun and can be seen along portions of State Route 12. The original Cal-P line ran to Vallejo, not along the present main line route through the Suisun Marsh between Suisun – Benicia – Martinez.

- January 3, 1865 California Pacific Rail Road Company is incorporated through the consolidation of the Sacramento & San Francisco Rail Road Company and the San Francisco & Marysville Rail Road Company.
- December 24, 1866 commenced grading from Vallejo towards Suisun then Davisville (Davis).
- April 10, 1868 commenced laying of rails.
- June 24, 1868 construction completed Vallejo - Suisun (via Napa Junction).
- July 27, 1868 construction completed Suisun - Elmira.
- August 10, 1868 construction completed Elmira - Dixon.
- August 22, 1868 construction completed Dixon - Davisville (Davis)
- November 11, 1868 construction completed Vallejo to Washington, California, across the Sacramento river from the city of Sacramento.
- November 15, 1868 construction completed Davisville (Davis) - Washington, California
- January 21, 1869 inaugural service from San Francisco to Sacramento, via the steamer New World to Vallejo, thence by railroad to Sacramento. Total time four hours; fare four dollars.
- April 14, 1869 renamed the California Pacific Railroad Extension Company.
- June 9, 1869 acquires under foreclosure the Napa Valley Rail Road Company which was founded and developed by Samuel Brannan
- October 2, 1869 construction started on the first railroad bridge across the Sacramento river; petition of Central Pacific to halt construction was denied

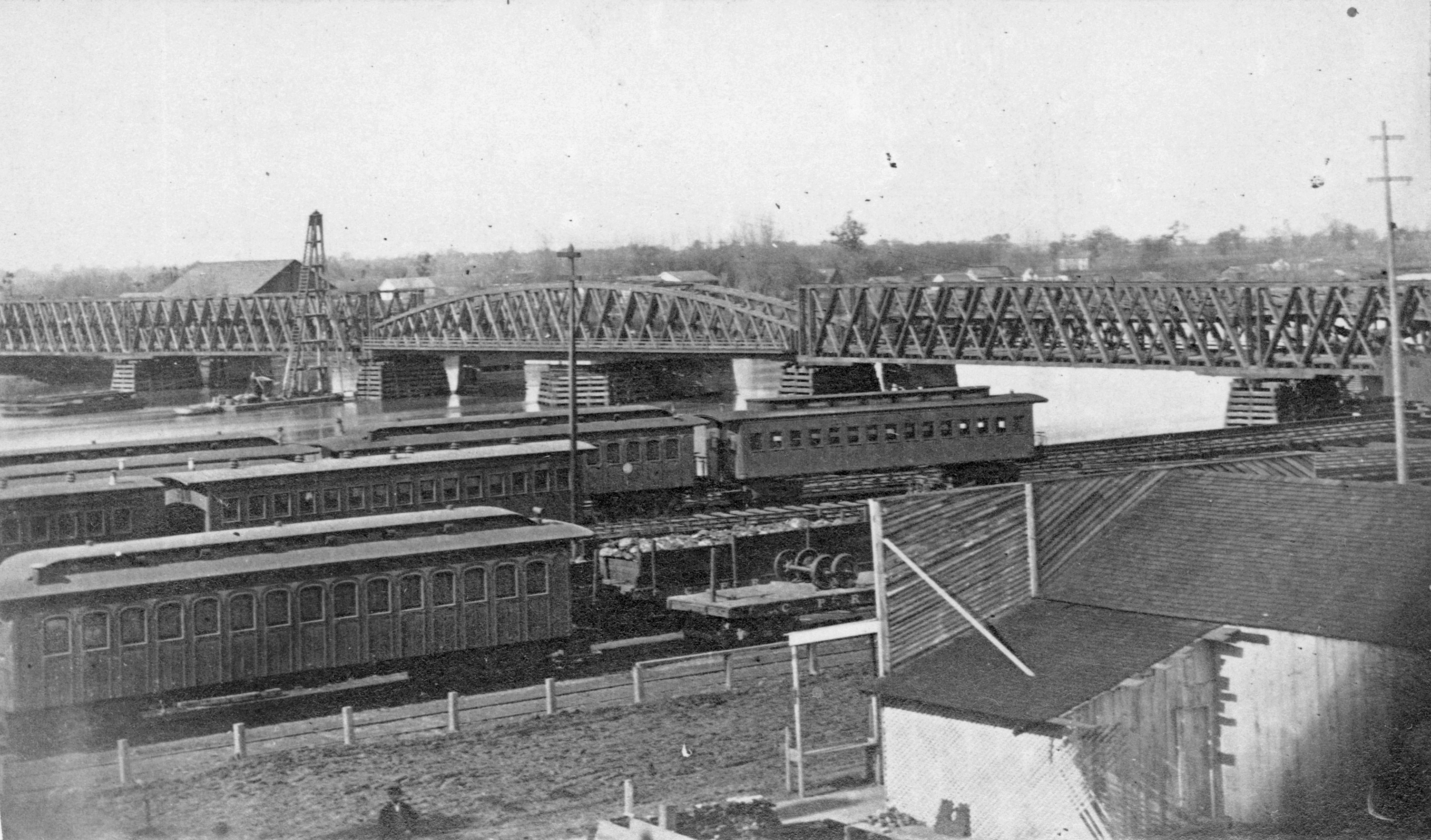
California Pacific Railroad bridge, Sacramento (1870-1878). Looking west towards Yolo County.

- December 23, 1869 renamed the California Pacific Railroad Company.
- January 15, 1870 bridge construction completed from Washington, California to the city of Sacramento. The railroad ceases to be operated by builder, D.C. Haskin, and begins operation by California Pacific.
- January 29, 1870 California Pacific enters Sacramento city limits by train for the first time, over the objections of the Central Pacific, thus completing the Vallejo to Sacramento line to a great celebration in Sacramento.
- July 1871 Central Pacific offer to buy railroad but offer is rejected. Central Pacific announces plan to build a line paralleling Cal-P but crossing the Carquinez Strait at Benicia instead of at Vallejo (Cal-P's route).
- September 1, 1871 largest railroad transfer on Pacific coast to Central Pacific when it gained control of the majority of Cal-P's stocks.

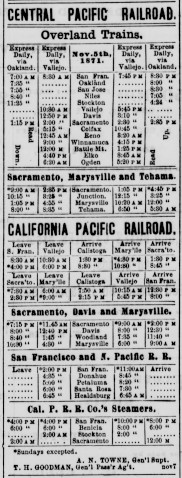
Nov 1871 Timetable of Central Pacific, after it gained control of California Pacific on 1 Sept 1871

- December 1871 flooding damages track between Knight's Landing and Yuba City/Marysville, placing line out of service and causing railroad financial hardship.
- June 30, 1876 the railroad, facing financial difficulties caused by the flooding of December 1871, is sold to the Central Pacific Railroad but continues to be listed as California Pacific.
- May 14, 1877 damaged and abandoned track is removed between Knight's Landing and Yuba City.
- December 6, 1879 Central Pacific completes 17-mile (27 km) line from Suisun - Benicia and the trial run of the train ferry Solano across the Carquinez Strait (1.08 miles) between Benicia and Port Costa begins.
- April 1, 1885 the railroad was leased to and operated by the Southern Pacific Railroad. SP also acquires the Northern Railway, a subsidiary paper railroad of the SP.
- 1888 listed in ICC reports as a non-operating subsidiary of Southern Pacific Railroad.
- April 14, 1898 the railroad is sold to the Southern Pacific Railroad.

The Southern Pacific line between Martinez and Sacramento (or perhaps Oakland and Sacramento) is informally known as the "Cal-P" after the original builder of the line, the California Pacific Railroad.

== Other Cal-P lines ==
=== Napa Valley Railroad ===
California Pacific purchased the Napa Valley Rail Road at foreclosure on June 9, 1869.

The Napa Valley Rail Road was built from the head of navigation on the Napa River, Soscol, near Skaggs Island, to Napa, St. Helena, and Calistoga. It was backed by a group headed by Samuel Brannan, a Calistoga resort owner. The track from Soscol to Napa was completed on July 11, 1865. The NVRR reached Oakville on September 15, 1867, St. Helena on February 27, 1868, and Calistoga on July 31, 1868. After the Cal-P built through the lower Napa Valley to Vallejo, the NVRR built a connection south to the Cal-P at Adelante in January, 1869. The California Pacific purchased the NVRR in June 1869 when the NVRR was sold under foreclosure. After purchasing the Cal-P, the Southern Pacific operated passenger service to Calistoga until 1929. In the 1980s, as freight service declined, the track beyond St. Helena was abandoned. In 1987 the track from Napa to St. Helena was sold to the new Napa Valley Railroad for operation of the Napa Valley Wine Train.

=== Cal-P line from Davis–Marysville ===
The Cal-P also built a line from Davisville (Davis) to Yuba City/Marysville. The track was completed from Davisville – Knight's Landing on September 23, 1869. The line reached Yuba City on November 22, 1869, and Marysville on February 15, 1870. A branch line to Josephine opened in 1926. The line between Knights Landing and Marysville was abandoned in sections between the 1940s (at the northern end) and the early 1970s (at the southern end).

The line from Davis to Woodland was later operated by the Southern Pacific and currently by the California Northern Railroad.
