= Suisun Bay =

Shallow tidal estuary in Northern California, US

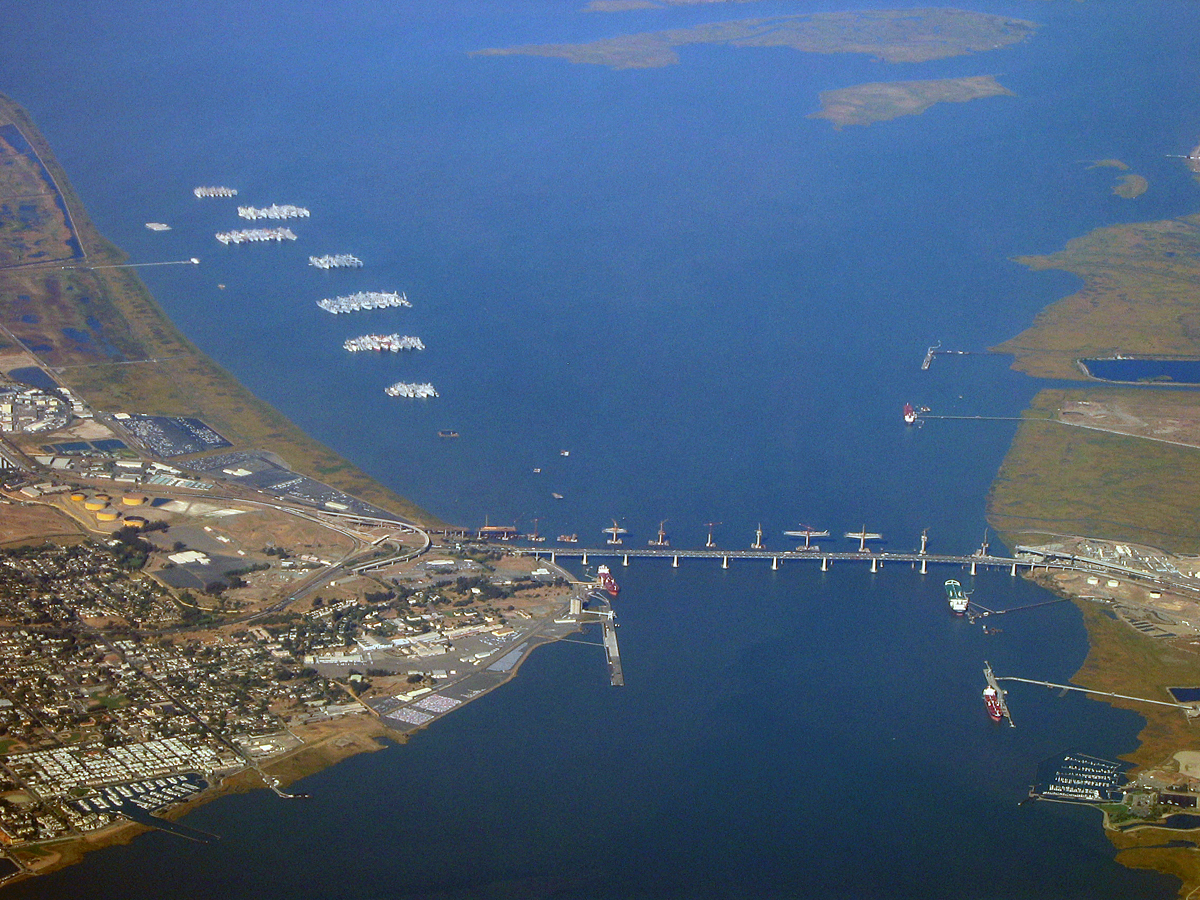
- Aerial photo of the Suisun Bay, looking east at the Benicia-Martinez Bridges. Benicia is on the left, Martinez to the right.

- Location within Sacramento-San Joaquin River Delta Location within San Francisco Bay Area Location within California Location within the United States
- Coordinates: 38.07°N 122.07°W
- Type: Bay
- River sources: Sacramento and San Joaquin River
- Ocean/sea sources: Pacific Ocean
- Basin countries: United States
- Settlements: Antioch and Oakley

Suisun Bay (/suːˈsuːn/ soo-SOON); Patwin for "where the west wind blows") is a shallow tidal estuary (a northeastern extension of San Francisco Bay) in Northern California. It lies at the confluence of the Sacramento River and San Joaquin River, forming the entrance to the Sacramento–San Joaquin River Delta, an inverted river delta. To the west, Suisun Bay is drained by the Carquinez Strait, which connects to San Pablo Bay, a northern extension of San Francisco Bay. Grizzly Bay forms a northern extension of Suisun Bay. Suisun Bay is between Contra Costa County to the south and Solano County to the north.

The bay was named in 1811 after the Suisunes, a Patwin tribe of Wintun people.

The Central Pacific Railroad built a train ferry that operated between Benicia and Port Costa, California, from 1879 to 1930. The ferry boats Solano and Contra Costa were removed from service when the nearby Martinez railroad bridge was completed in 1930. From 1913 until 1954 the Sacramento Northern Railway, an electrified interurban line, crossed Suisun Bay with the Ramon, a distillate-powered train ferry.

On April 28, 2004, a petroleum pipeline operated by Kinder Morgan Energy Partners ruptured, initially reported as spilling 1,500 barrels (264m³) of diesel fuel in the marshes, but, this was later updated to about 2,950 barrels. Kinder Morgan pleaded guilty to operating a corroded pipeline (and cited for failing to notify authorities quickly after the spill was discovered) and paid three million dollars in penalties and restitution.

== Geography ==
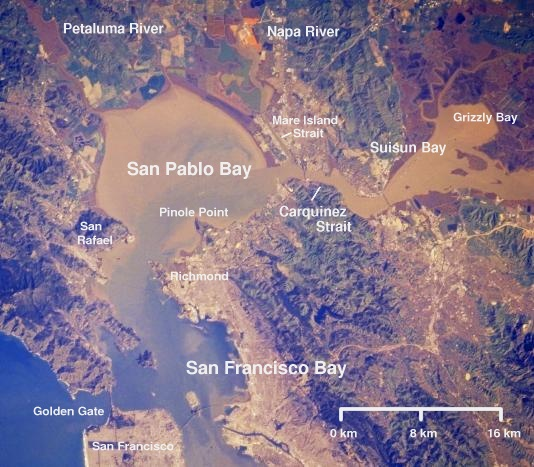
San Pablo Bay with Suisun Bay at upper right.

== Suisun Bay Reserve Fleet ==
The bay was the anchorage of the Suisun Bay Reserve Fleet, a part of the US Navy Mothball or Ghost Fleet, a collection of U.S. Navy and merchant reserve ships which was created in the period following World War II. The USNS Glomar Explorer was anchored here after recovering parts of a sunken Soviet submarine in the mid-1970s (see Project Azorian). Many ships were removed and sold for scrap in the 1990s. In 2010, plans were announced to remove the oldest remaining parts of the Suisun Bay mothball fleet in stages. The last of the 57 ships in the old Mothball Fleet were removed in August 2017. There are still a number of naval ships in Suisun Bay. Most are part of the Military Sealift Command Ready Reserve Fleet.

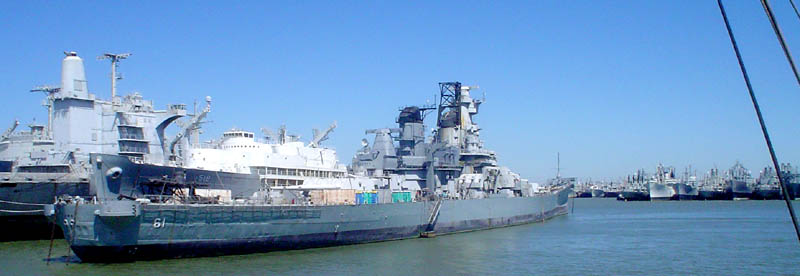
The battleship USS Iowa and "Ghost Fleet" in Suisun Bay (Iowa has since moved to the Port of Los Angeles as a museum ship).

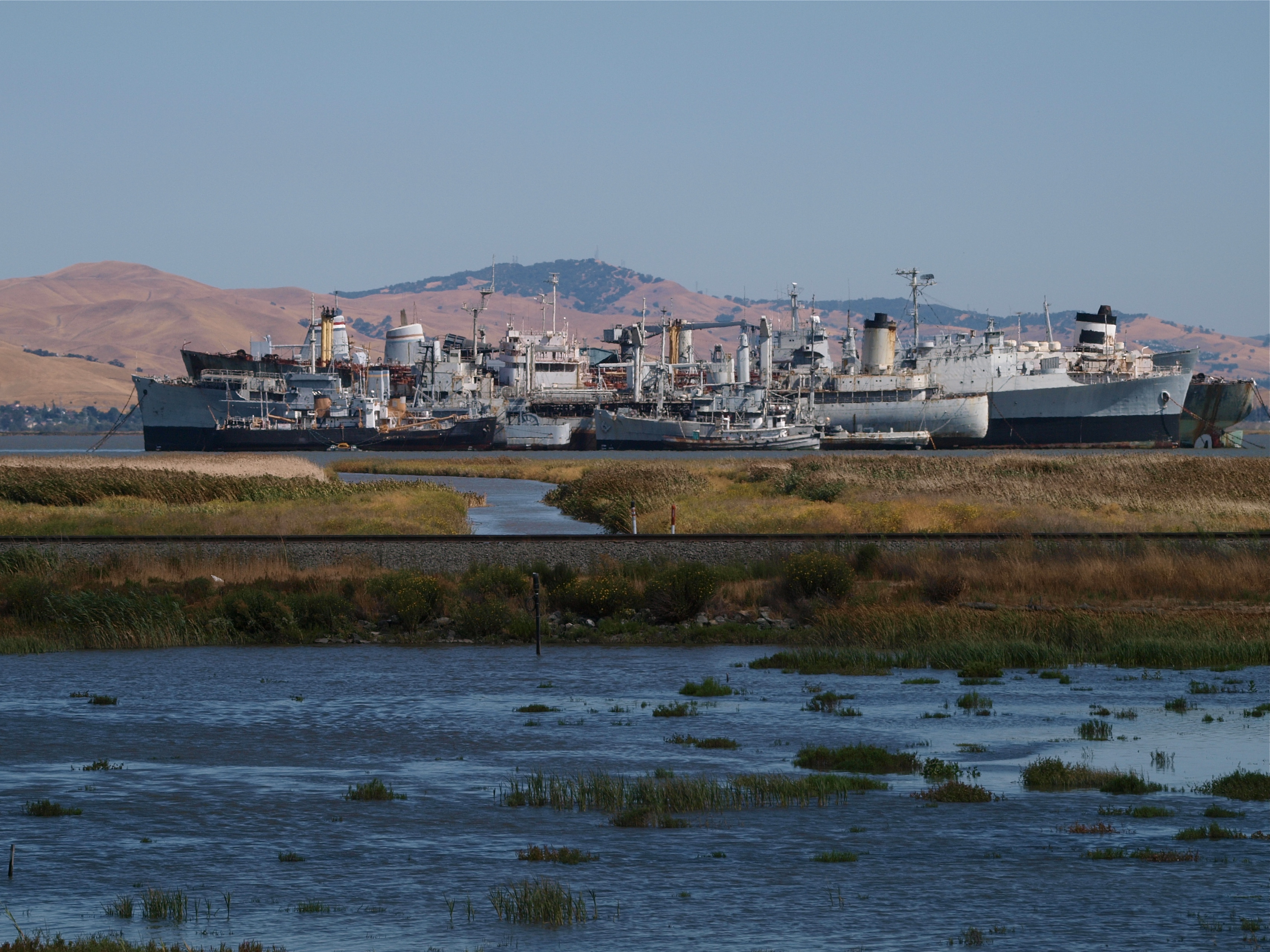
Another view of the "Ghost Fleet", also known as the "Moth Ball Fleet".

== See also ==
- San Francisco Bay
- Grizzly Bay
- Stockton Deepwater Shipping Channel
- Sacramento Deep Water Ship Channel
