= Lake Corcoran =

Former lake in the state of California, United States

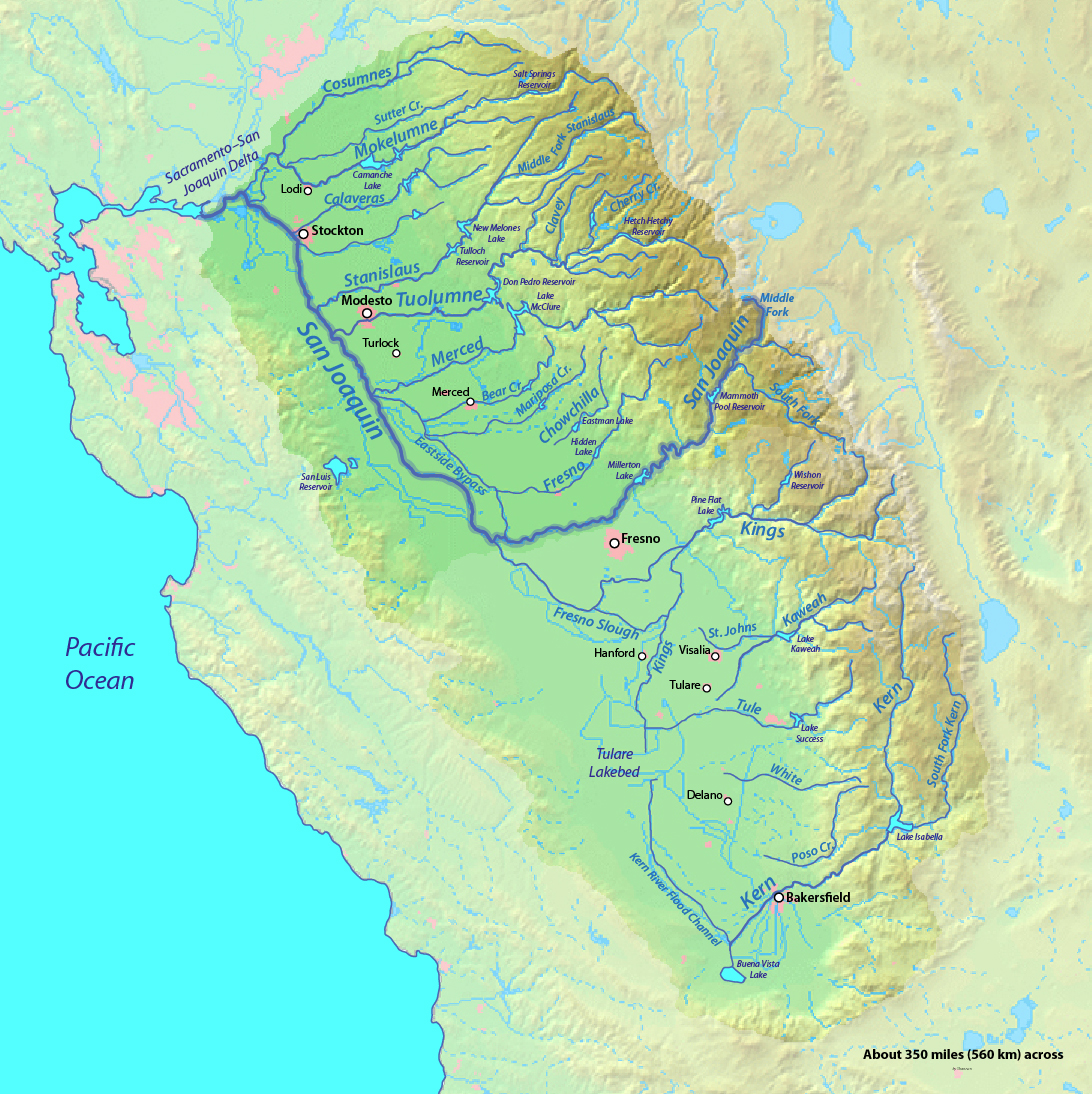
- Present-day San Joaquin Valley drainage
- Interactive map of Lake Corcoran
- Location: Central Valley, California, United States
- Coordinates: 37°N 120.3°W
- Type: Lake
- Primary inflows: Sacramento River, San Joaquin River
- Basin countries: United States
- Surface area: 30,000–50,000 square kilometers (12,000–19,000 sq mi)

Lake Corcoran (also known as Lake Clyde, after Clyde Wahrhaftig, an American geologist) was an ancient lake that covered the Central Valley of California.

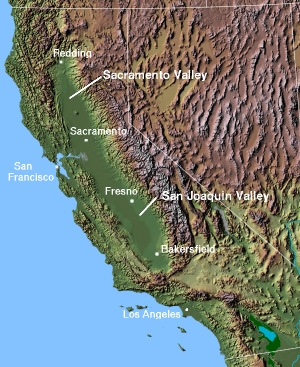
Central Valley map

The lake existed in the valleys of the Sacramento River and the San Joaquin River, at least as far north as the Sutter Buttes and present-day Zamora, California. If so, it might have had a size comparable to Lake Michigan. An alternate view presumes that the lake covered only the southern parts of the Central Valley. The total surface covered by the lake amounts to about 30,000–50,000 square kilometers (12,000–19,000 sq mi). Buena Vista Lake, Kern Lake and Tulare Lake are remnants of Lake Corcoran.

The lake is the source of the Corcoran Clay, a lacustrine unit of the Tulare and Turlock Lake formations. It also influenced sedimentation off the coast of California.

The lake existed between about 758,000 and 665,000 years ago. Clay deposition rates indicate that the lake lasted for 50,000 to 100,000 years, and it underwent about 15 dry-wet cycles. The Lava Creek Tuff of Yellowstone Caldera and the Bishop Tuff of the Long Valley Caldera were deposited in the Corcoran Clay. Before Lake Corcoran formed, the Central Valley was a bay open to the south via a passage, until 2 million years ago when the bay was separated from the ocean, probably due to northwestward movement of the Coast Ranges along the San Andreas Fault. Subsequently, the valley was no longer a bay and alternately drained and filled with water. The factors contributing to the formation of Lake Corcoran are not fully understood but it appears that Great Valley drainage for most of the Miocene epoch was to the south.

The lake originally drained into Monterey Bay via the Salinas River, or at times not at all. Evaporation from this lake was a source of water for the Sierra Nevada and in lesser measure for the Basin and Range Province behind it. This contributed to the formation of large pluvial lakes in Nevada.

Six hundred thousand years ago a new outlet formed in the present day San Francisco Bay, where it remains today. Sediments found south of San Francisco indicate that by 400,000 years ago the drainage was fully established. The overflow may have occurred at a time when glaciers were melting and when shifts in the jet stream during the marine oxygen isotope stage 6 caused increased precipitation in and runoff to the Central Valley. The overflow rapidly carved an outlet through Carquinez Strait, probably catastrophically, and drained the lake. The Upper Turbidite Unit of the Monterey submarine fan may have formed soon after this outflow, when sediment from the former lake was carried out of its new outlet and down to Monterey Bay by longshore drift.
