= Inverted river delta =

River delta which is located inland and not on the ocean

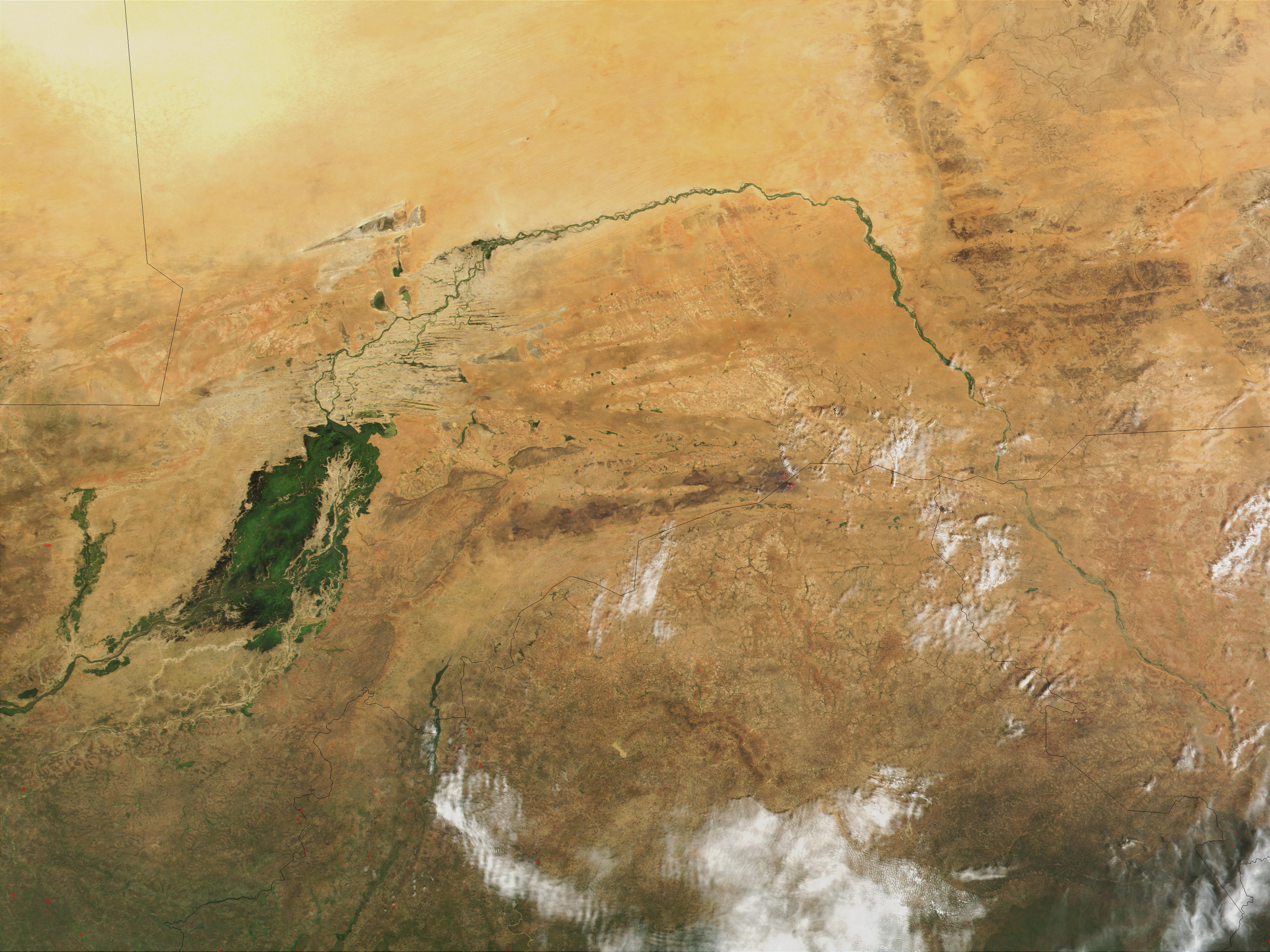
Inland delta of the Niger River.

An inverted river delta is a river delta in which the narrow end of the delta emerges on the seafront and the wide end is located further inland, so that with respect to the seafront, the locations of both ends of the delta are inverted.

== Explanation ==
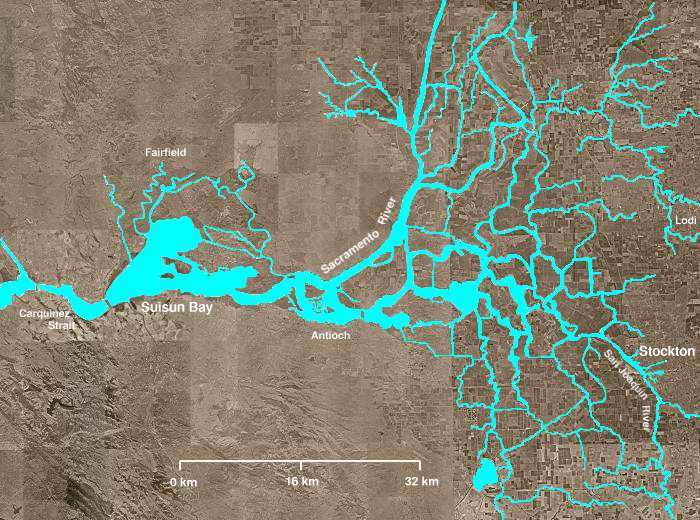
A picture of California's Sacramento-San Joaquin River Delta, with Suisun Bay at left-center and the Carquinez Strait at far left

River deltas typically form on flat, coastal floodplains: the narrow end located at the point where a river fans out and deposits sediment in a region extending outward into the body of water which the river empties. In the case of an inverted delta, the delta is located at the waterway's exit from a large, flat valley, yet still inside the valley. The sediment is dropped within the valley and the clear water then exits into a bay or the ocean, so the apex of the delta is at this exit, a configuration said to be inverted from that usually seen. Inverted deltas typically do not last long in geological terms, since they tend to fill up with sediments rather quickly and eventually become normal deltas.

== Examples ==
=== The Sacramento-San Joaquin River Delta ===
A classic example of an inverted river delta is the Sacramento-San Joaquin River Delta, which lies at the confluence of the Sacramento and San Joaquin rivers in California. The water from the rivers that drain the entire, large California Central Valley exit through the Carquinez Strait, a narrow gap in the Coast Range. An inverted river delta exists behind this strait.

=== The Tagus River ===
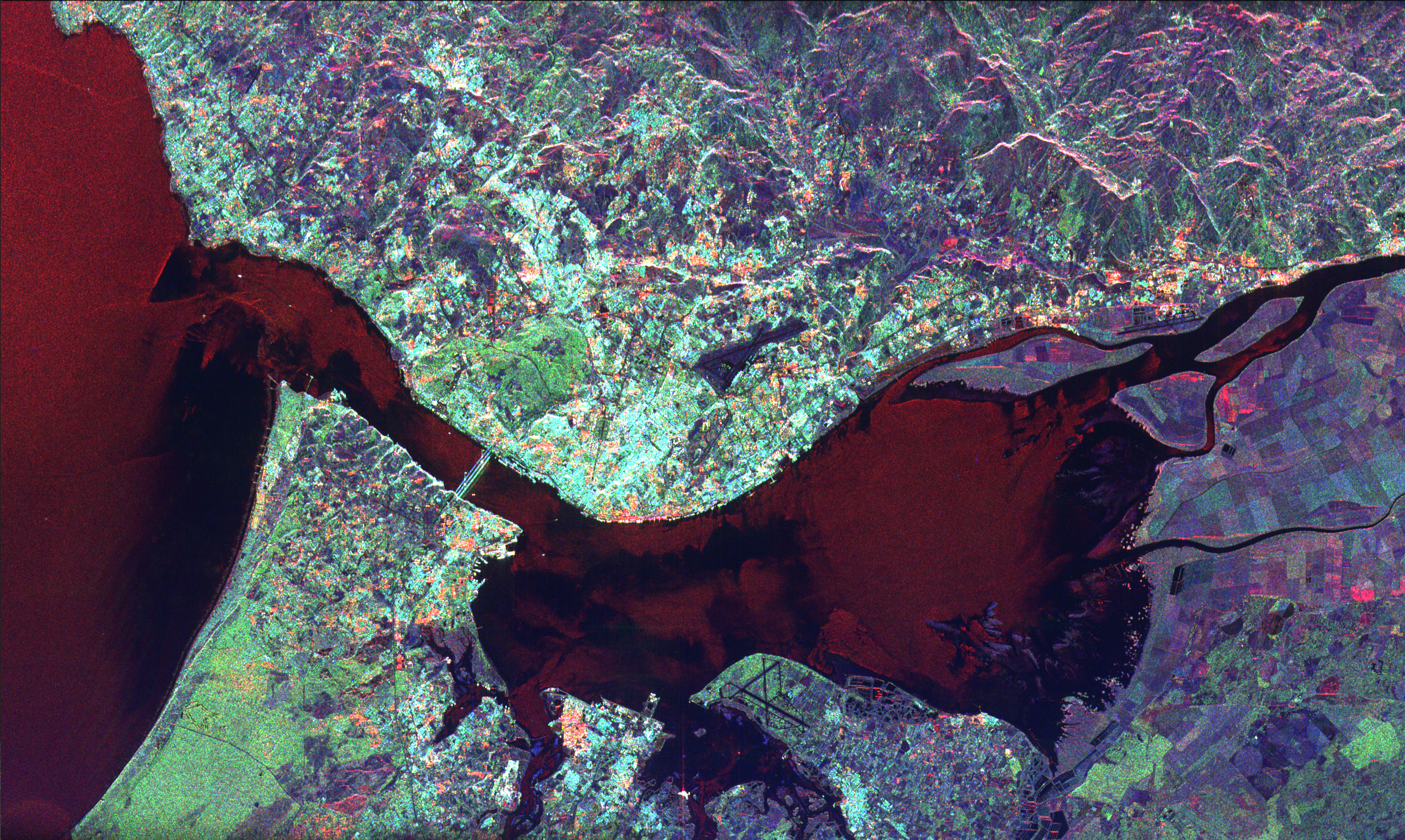
City of Lisbon and Tagus river delta as seen from space.

Another example is the delta of the Tagus river in Portugal, although due to sedimentation, this delta is now only partially inverted, with the valley now mostly filled with sediment. It is still about 15 km (9.3 mi) wide and 25 km (15.5 mi) long, compared with the 2 km-wide (1.2 mi) exit into the sea, and forms a large lagoon with large and very shallow sand banks which are uncovered during low tides.
