= Dewitt Clinton Haskin =

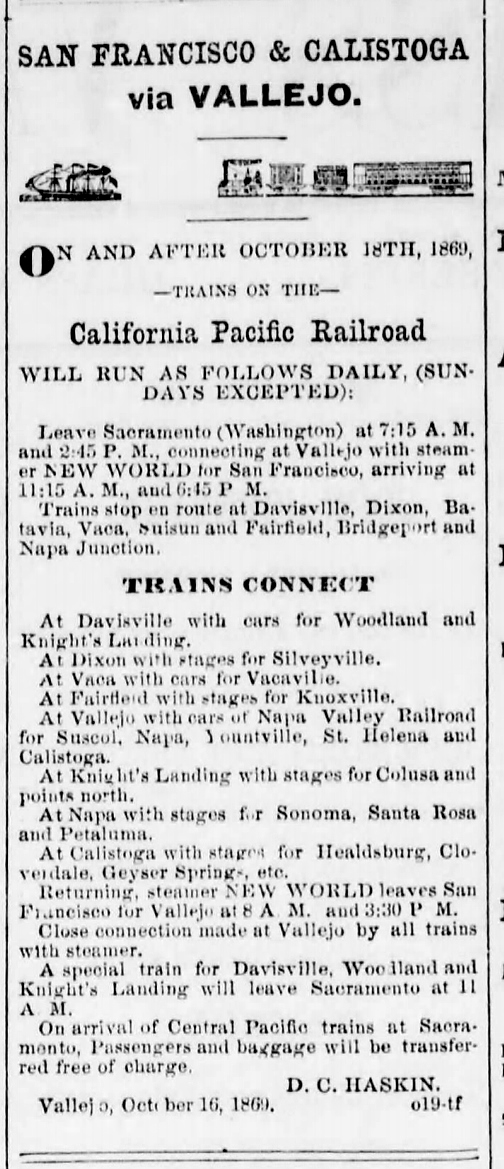
California Pacific Railroad: D. C. Haskin, effective October 18, 1869

Col. Dewitt Clinton Haskin (circa 1824 – July 17, 1900) was an American engineer who developed the initial methods for construction of the first tunnels under the Hudson River between New Jersey and Manhattan.

In the late 1860s, Haskin gained experience in California on the construction of the California Pacific Railroad.

For the Hudson and Manhattan Railroad project, he founded the Hudson Tunnel Company in 1873, and began construction in 1874 by digging a shaft in Jersey City, New Jersey. He had patented a compressed air method for reducing cave-ins, but in 1880, 20 workers were killed in a blowout. Another blowout in 1881 and a gradual loss of funding halted the project in 1887. After a British firm worked on the project from 1889-1891, the lawyer William Gibbs McAdoo completed the project in 1908. (See Uptown Hudson Tubes.)
