= Carquinez Strait Powerline Crossing =

Coordinates: 38°03′23″N 122°12′05″W

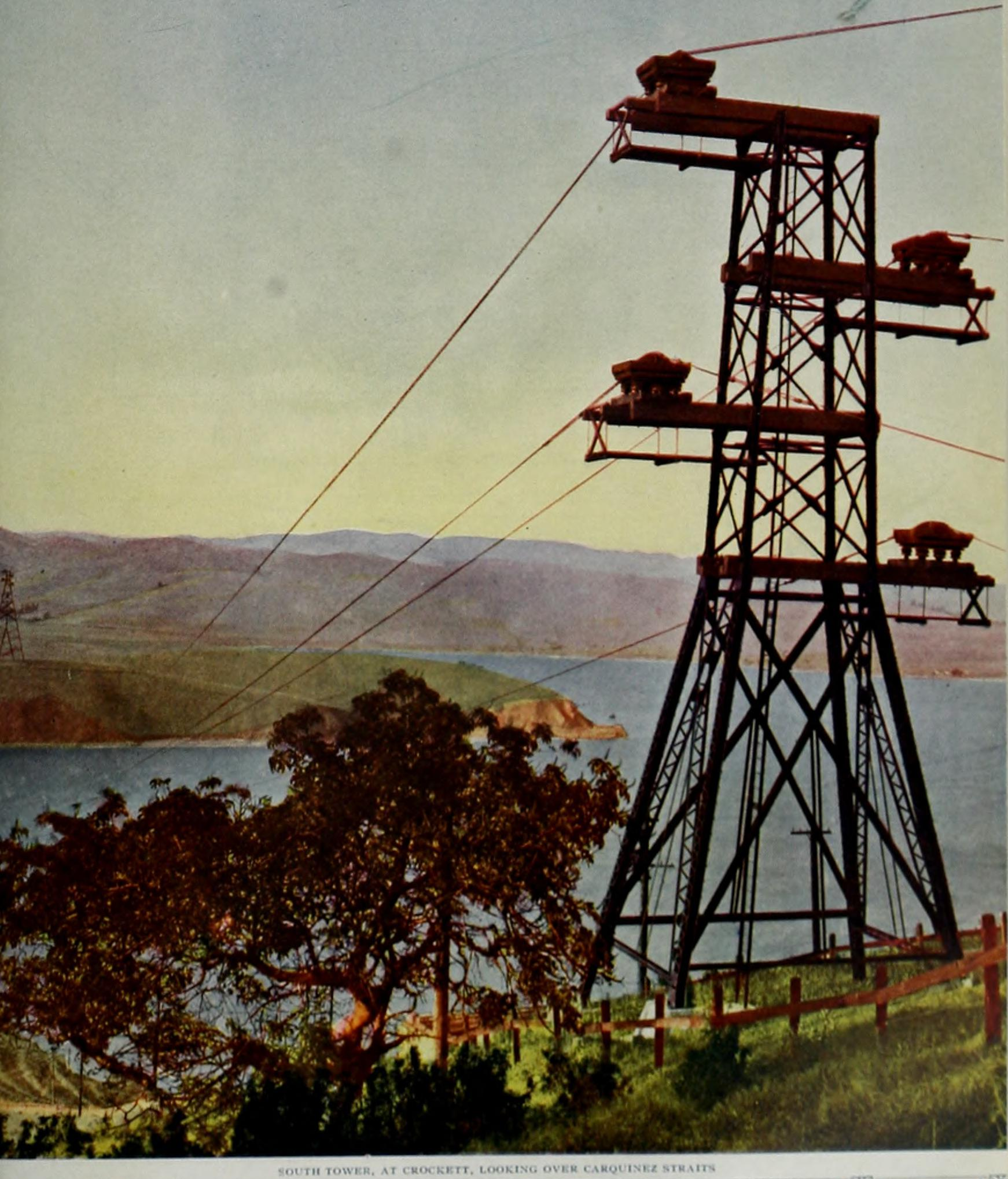
- South tower at Crockett, California, looking over Carquinez Strait, before 1914

Location
- Country: United States
- State: California

Ownership information
- Operator: Bay Counties Power Company

Construction information
- Decommissioned: yes

Technical information
- AC voltage: 60 kV

Carquinez Strait Powerline Crossing was the world's first powerline crossing of a large river. It was built in 1901 for a 60 kV powerline operated by Bay Counties Power Company to deliver electric power from their Colgate powerhouse to Oakland, California. For this a crossing of Carquinez Strait was required, which has at its narrowest point at Dillon Point a width of about 2,750 feet (840 m). Such a span width was impossible with wooden poles, which were common in those days. Installing an underwater cable was considered, but for reliability reasons an overhead power line was installed, which used at the north site of the river a 223-foot (68 m) tall lattice tower and at the south site one with a height of 66 feet (20 m).

The project was designated as a California Historic Civil Engineering Landmark by the American Society of Civil Engineers in 1976.

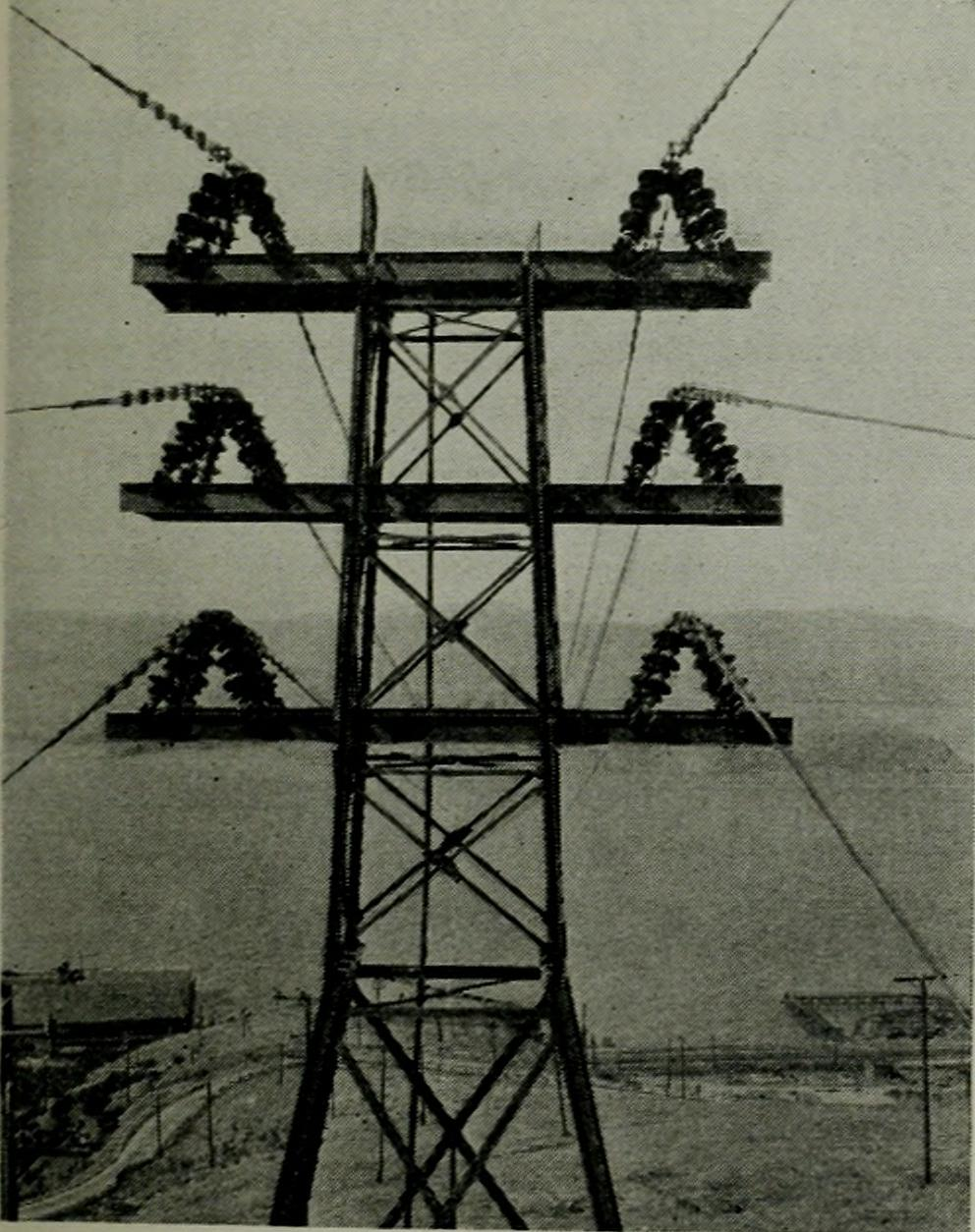
In 1914, a second circuit was added.
