= Solano (ferry) =

Railroad ferry

Coordinates: 38°01′01.92″N 121°48′18″W

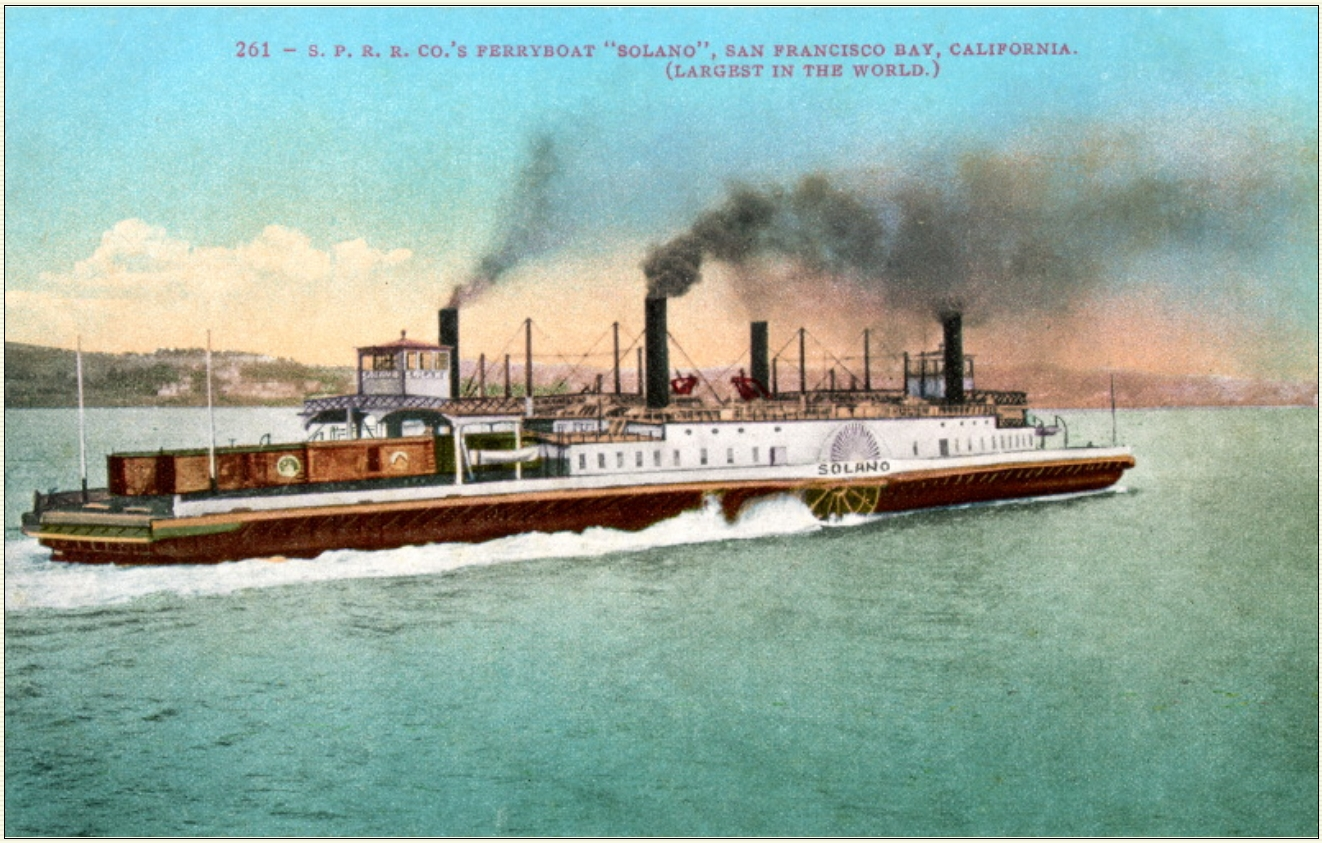
- Postcard of ferryboat Solano loaded with freight cars crossing the Carquinez Strait in California, c. 1910

History
- Namesake: Solano County, California
- Owner: Central Pacific Railroad
- Route: Benicia, California to Port Costa, California and return
- Cost: $350,000
- Maiden voyage: November 24, 1879
- In service: December 1, 1879
- Out of service: October 15, 1930
- Fate: Scuttled for breakwater c. 1931

General characteristics
- Type: Railroad ferry to transport entire trains
- Length: 425 ft (130 m)
- Beam: 116 ft (35 m)
- Installed power: two 2,000 horsepower (1,500 kW) steam engines
- Propulsion: two independent sidewheels
- Speed: 12 mph (19 km/h)
- Capacity: 24-car passenger train with locomotive or 48-car freight train with locomotive

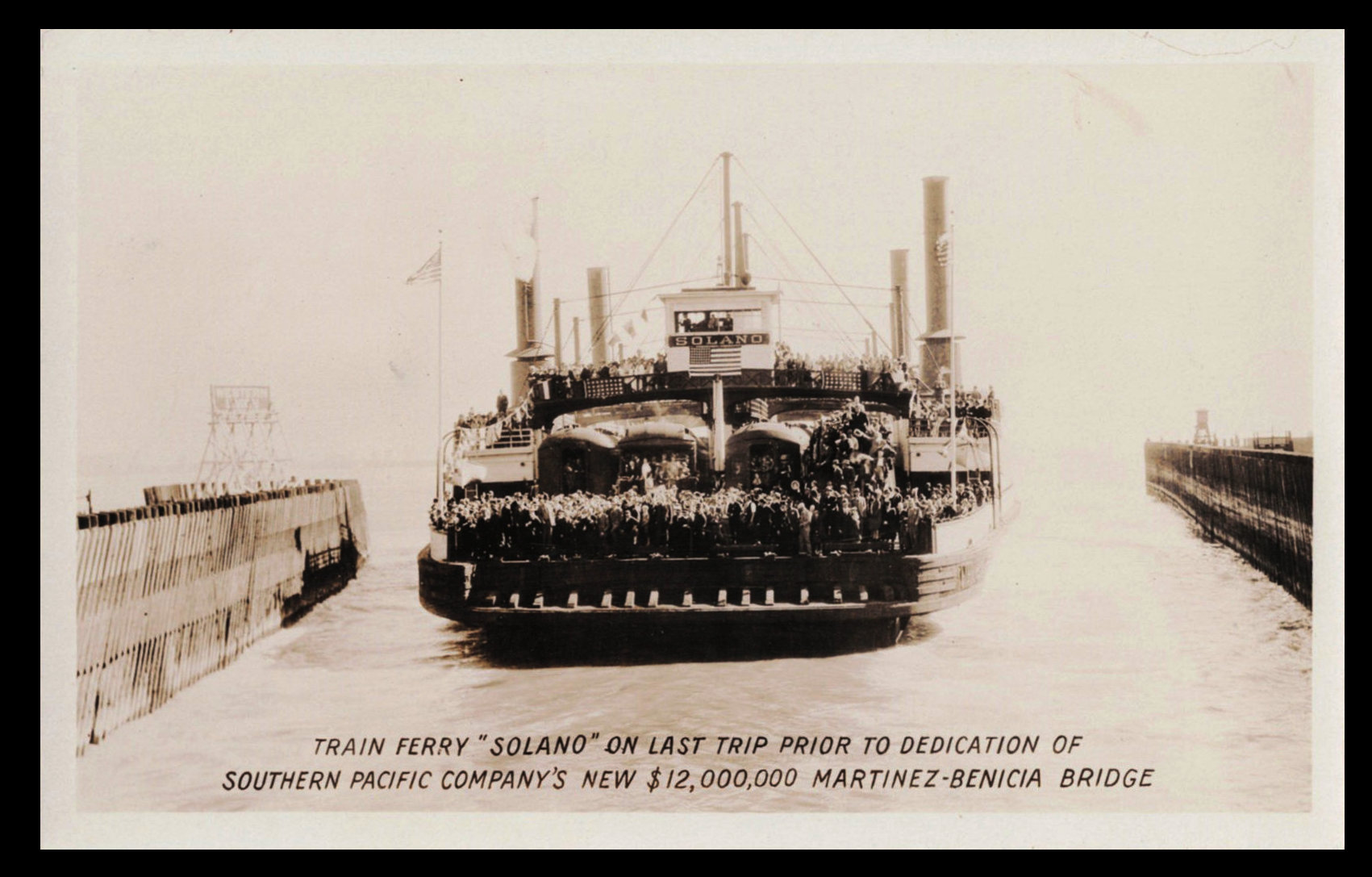
The last trip of the Solano

The Solano was a large railroad ferry, built as a reinforced paddle steamer with independently powered sidewheels by the Central Pacific Railroad, that carried entire trains across the Carquinez Strait between Benicia and Port Costa in California daily for 51 years, from 1879 to 1930. When launched, the Solano was the largest ferry of its kind in the world, a record held for 35 years until 1914 when she was joined by her sister ship, the Contra Costa, which was 13 feet (4.0 m) longer.

== Design ==
The Solano was designed by Arthur Brown, the superintendent of bridges and buildings for Central Pacific Railroad, who reinforced the ferryboat much like a rail bridge, using four wooden Pratt trusses longitudinally under the deck of her four sets of rails. She was powered by two 2,000 horsepower (1,500 kW) walking beam steam engines. Each engine, with a 5-foot bore and 11-foot stroke cylinder, drove a paddle wheel that in turn drove the ship through the water. With two side paddle wheels operating independently, the Solano had the maneuverability it needed to handle the currents (about 8 mph) of Carquinez Strait. With two pilot rooms, one at each end, there was no need to turn the ship around for return trips.

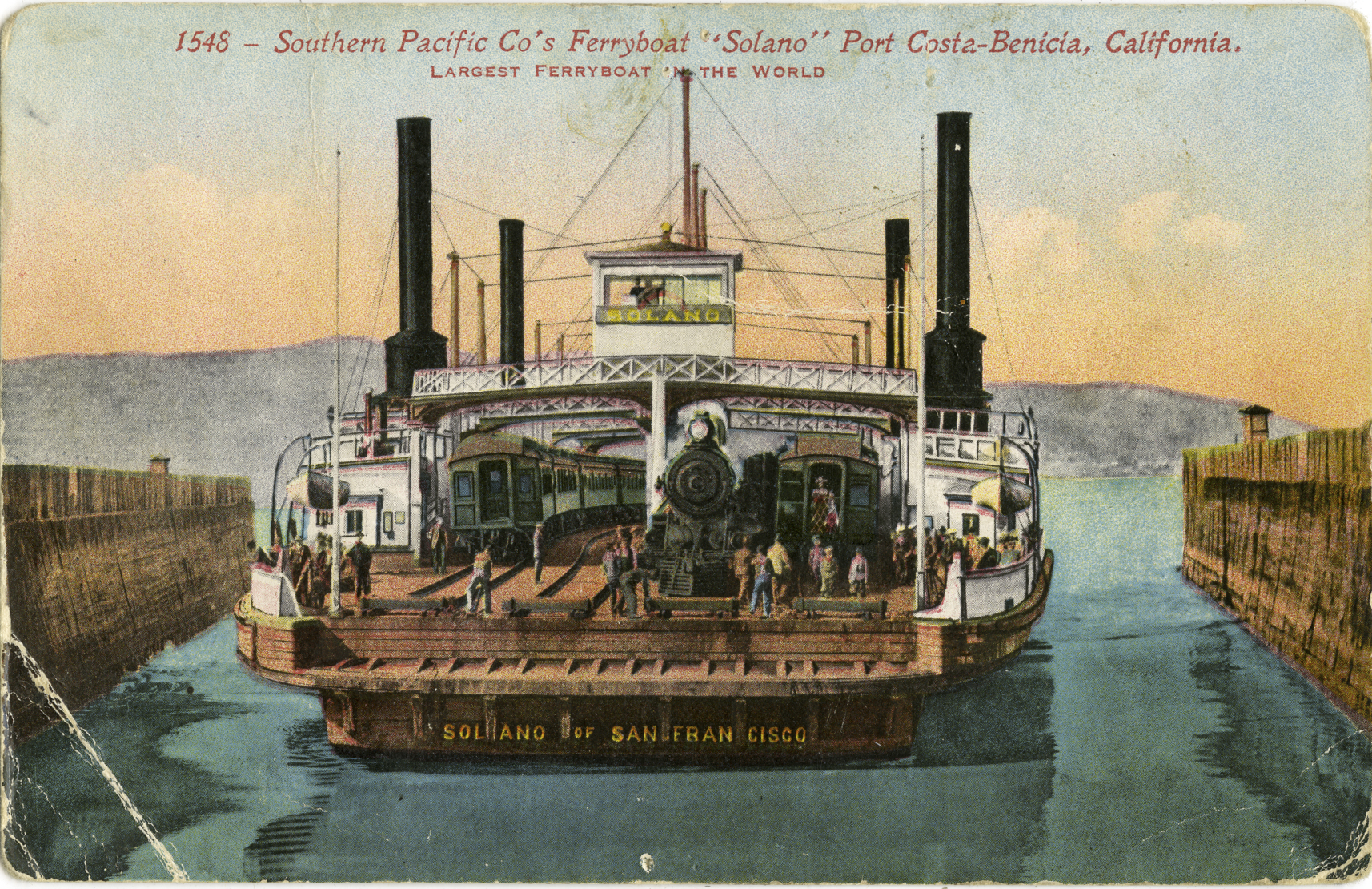
Postcard of the railroad ferry Solano, showing her four sets of tracks

The ferry slips and approaches were also designed by Arthur Brown. The slip at Benicia reached out into the strait diagonally downstream, whereas the slip at Port Costa, being further downstream from Benicia, pointed directly upstream. The distance across was about one mile, only thirteen lengths of the Solano; the designed time in transit including starting and stopping was nine minutes. The 100-foot long apron or linkspan on each slip had four sets of rails, matching the four sets on the ferry to facilitate loading and unloading, and was hinged and balanced by weights and pontoons to accommodate the nine-foot tides.

The Solano, named for the county in which Benicia sits, was built in 1879 in Oakland, California near the end of Long Wharf. She was 425 feet (130 m) long and 116 feet (35 m) wide and was capable of carrying on her four tracks an entire 24-car passenger train plus locomotive or a 48-car freight train and locomotive. She commenced trials on November 24, 1879 from Meigg's Wharf, with 75 selected guests, including Charles Crocker and Arthur Brown, on a trip around Alcatraz and arrived at Benicia with great fanfare, which included a military band and a twenty-six gun salute. She could travel at about 12 miles per hour (19 km/h), though on the first day of her trial did not exceed 8 miles per hour (13 km/h).

She was constructed and operated by the Central Pacific Railroad to ferry entire trains (up to 48 freight cars at a time) on the Central Pacific transcontinental line to and from the San Francisco Bay Area. Once in service, the transcontinental railroad was re-routed from its original 1869 120-mile (190 km) course from Sacramento to Oakland, via Altamont Pass and Niles Canyon, to the 1879 more level 92-mile course from Sacramento to Benicia and, via the Solano, to Oakland. Before her sister ship, Contra Costa, was constructed, Solano was the largest ferry ever built.

== Operation ==
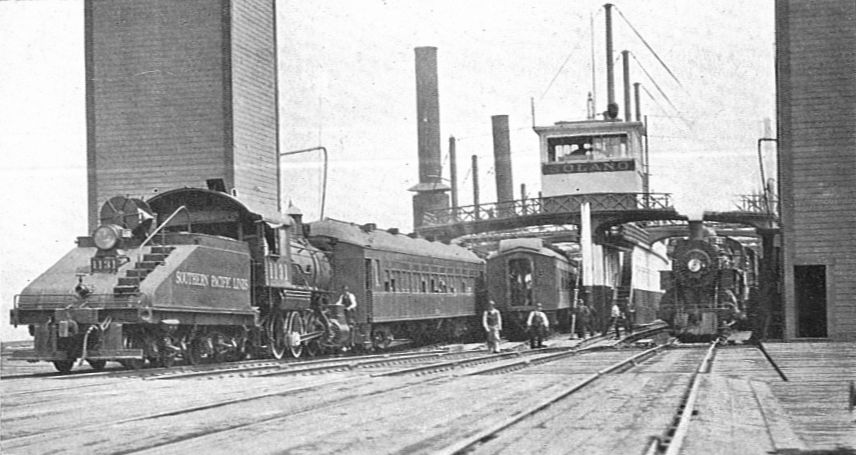
Loading a train onto the Solano, 1928

The Solano began regular service between Benicia and Port Costa in December 1879. A typical operation was described in detail by Harris in 1890: "A passenger train of, say, ten cars comes to the slip. During its pause of a minute, the train has been uncoupled in the middle and a switching engine has been attached to its rear; the regular engine proceeds with the forward half of the train on to the boat, the switching engine pushes the rear half on another track of the boat, the steamer is cast off with the entire train and both engines as cargo..." The time card for the station of Benicia on the north and Port Costa on the south of the Straits allowed twenty-five minutes for the entire operation, including embarkation, ferriage, landing and station stops. This feat was accomplished with two watches of sixteen men each.

Apart from a few drydocks for rebuilding and upgrading, the Solano was in continuous service, 24 hours a day, between Benicia and Port Costa for 51 years, from December 1, 1879 to October 15, 1930. In 1904 she was making 36 to 46 crossings every 24 hours, transporting about 115,000 freight cars and 56,000 passenger cars a year. Her sister ship, Contra Costa, was built in 1914 with the propelling machinery under the main deck, which made her main deck completely open for four parallel tracks with no center post. She was slightly larger (13 feet longer) than Solano and thus was the largest rail ferryboat. Contra Costa was named for the county in which Port Costa is located.

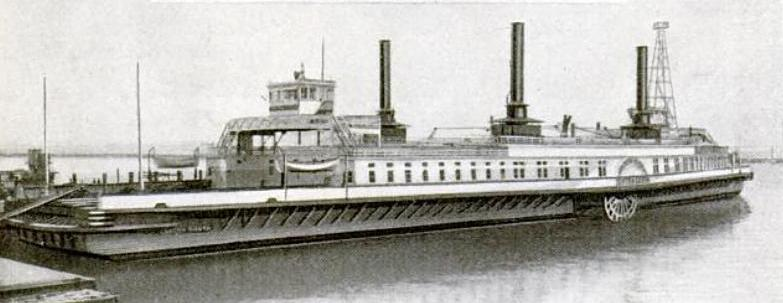
Solano's sister ship: Contra Costa c. 1917

By 1927, the two ferries had reached their maximum capacity. On May 31, 1928, the Southern Pacific (successor to the Central Pacific in operations of the ferries) authorized construction of a railroad drawbridge from the east side of Benicia to Martinez, which is east of Port Costa. The railroad bridge opened on October 15, 1930 and the two railroad ferries were decommissioned. The railroad bridge continues today to serve the Union Pacific and Amtrak railroads.

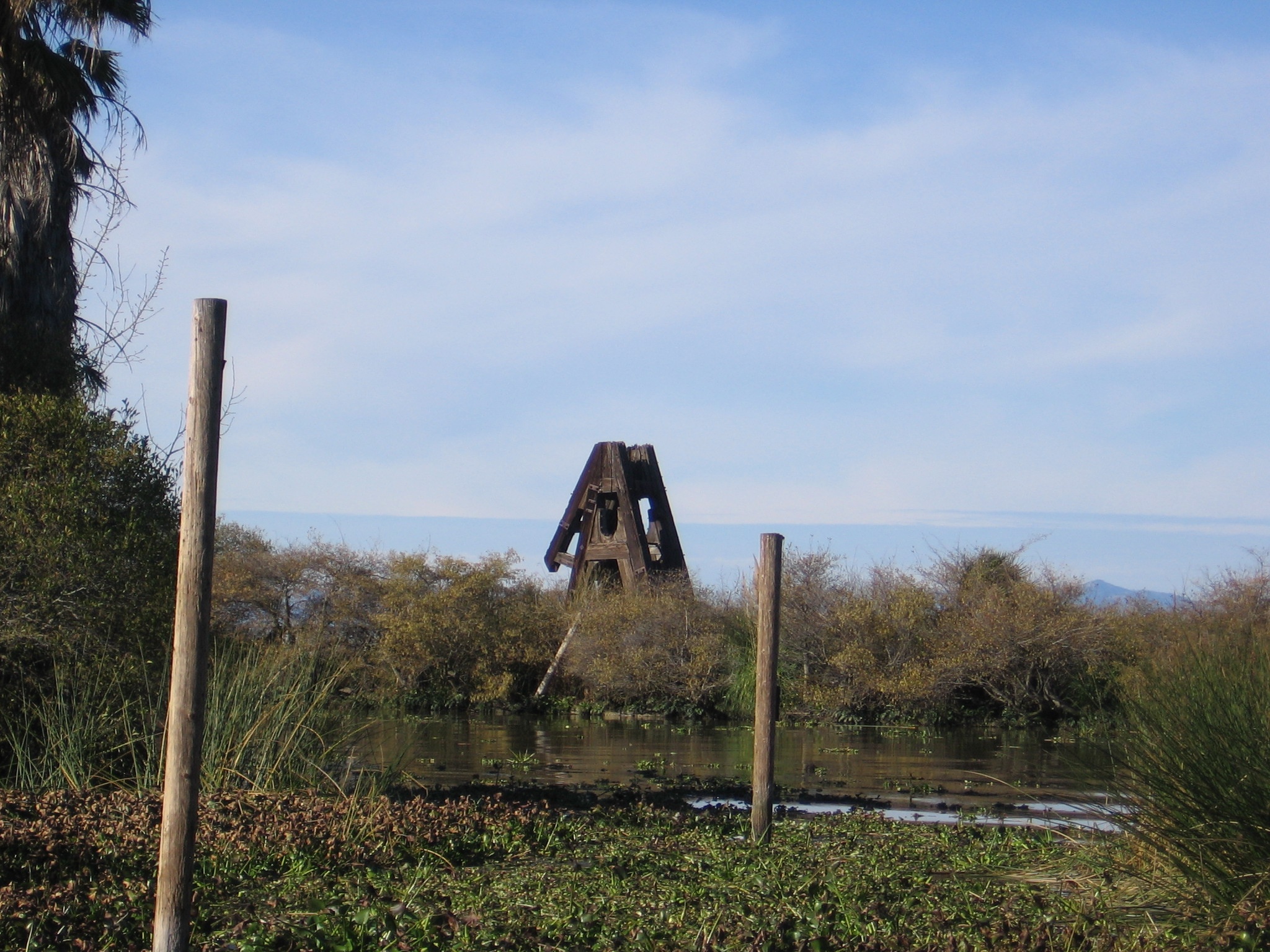
Remains of Solano, the A frame of her walking beam engine, in the San Joaquin River near Antioch, California

Following the opening of the railroad bridge, Solano and Contra Costa were dismantled and sold for scrap. However, what remains of the Solano, the A frame of her walking beam engine, can still be seen where she was scuttled to create a breakwater in the San Joaquin River near Antioch, California. The hulk of the Contra Costa was towed to a cove off of Vallejo adjacent to the California Maritime Academy and sunk to serve as a breakwater.
