= Carquinez Strait =

Tidal strait in Northern California

- Spanish: Estrecho de Carquinez
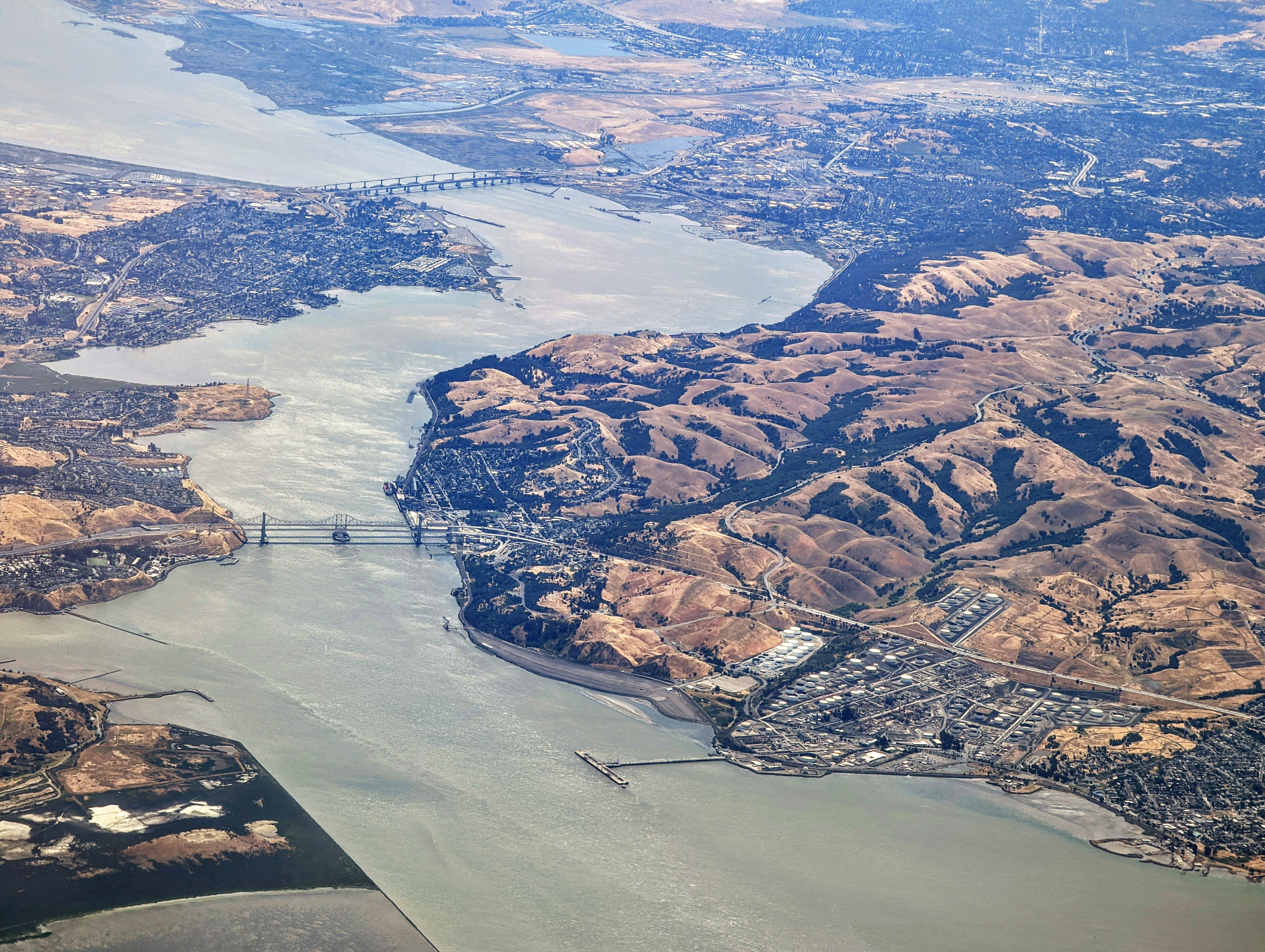
- Looking east, the Carquinez Bridge in the foreground and the Benicia–Martinez Bridge in the background

- Location within California
- Location: Bay Area, Northern California
- Coordinates: 38.05918°N 122.21260°W
- Etymology: The Karkin people
- River sources: Sacramento River, San Joaquin River
- Primary outflows: San Pablo Bay, San Francisco Bay
- Basin countries: United States
- Max. length: 8 miles (13 km)
- Settlements: Benicia, Crockett, Martinez, Vallejo

The Carquinez Strait (/kɑːrˈkiːnəs/; Spanish: Estrecho de Carquinez) is a narrow tidal strait located in the Bay Area of Northern California, United States. It is part of the tidal estuary of the Sacramento and the San Joaquin rivers as they drain into the San Francisco Bay. The strait is eight miles (13 km) long and connects Suisun Bay, which receives the waters of the combined rivers, with San Pablo Bay, a northern extension of the San Francisco Bay.

The strait formed in prehistoric times, near the close of one of the past ice ages, when the Central Valley was a vast inland lake. Melting ice from the Sierra Nevada raised the water level while seismic activity created a new outlet to the Pacific Ocean, draining the lake into the ocean and exposing the valley floors.

== Etymology ==
The strait is named after the Karkin people (los Carquines in Spanish), a linguistic division of the Ohlone indigenous peoples who once resided on both sides of the strait.

== History ==
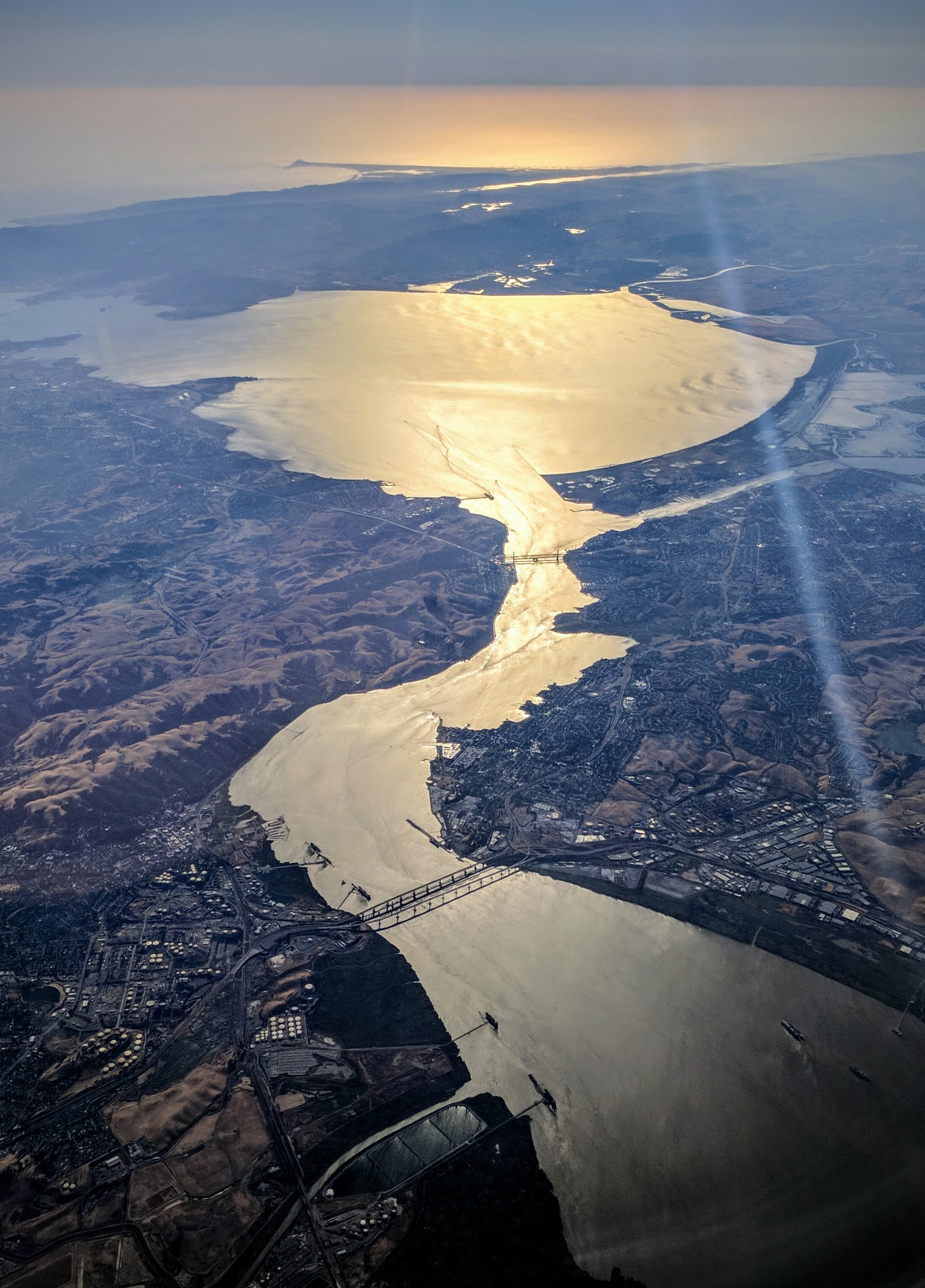
Suisun Bay (bottom), Carquinez Strait (with bridges crossing it), and San Pablo Bay (upper center), with Point Reyes in the background

Andrei Sarna-Wojcicki, a geologist emeritus of the US Geological Survey (USGS), estimates that the Carquinez Strait was likely formed about 640,000 to 700,000 years ago, while much of modern California was emerging from an ice age. The present Sacramento Valley and San Joaquin Valley were covered by a huge lake (now extinct), which has been called Lake Corcoran. Initially, this lake drained into the ocean through a valley near present-day Monterey. However, ongoing seismic activity raised the coastal mountains sufficiently to plug this outlet. Concurrently, ice melting off the Sierras raised the water level in Lake Corcoran until the lake began to carve a new outlet to the ocean. At some point, the coastal barrier collapsed between today's cities of Crockett and Benicia, releasing lake water in a cataclysmic flood.

The strait forms part of the county border between Solano (to the north) and Contra Costa (to the south), and it is approximately 15 mi (25 km) north of Oakland. The cities of Benicia and Vallejo lie on the north side of the strait, while Martinez, Port Costa, and Crockett sit on the southern coast. The Napa River joins the strait, via the short Mare Island Strait, near its entrance into San Pablo Bay. Its watershed covers 62,500 square miles (162,000 km^{2}), approximately 40 percent of California's total surface.

== Installations ==
The California Maritime Academy is at the western end of the strait on the northern waterfront. The C&H Sugar refinery is located on the southern shore in the small town of Crockett.

== Bridges and Ferries ==
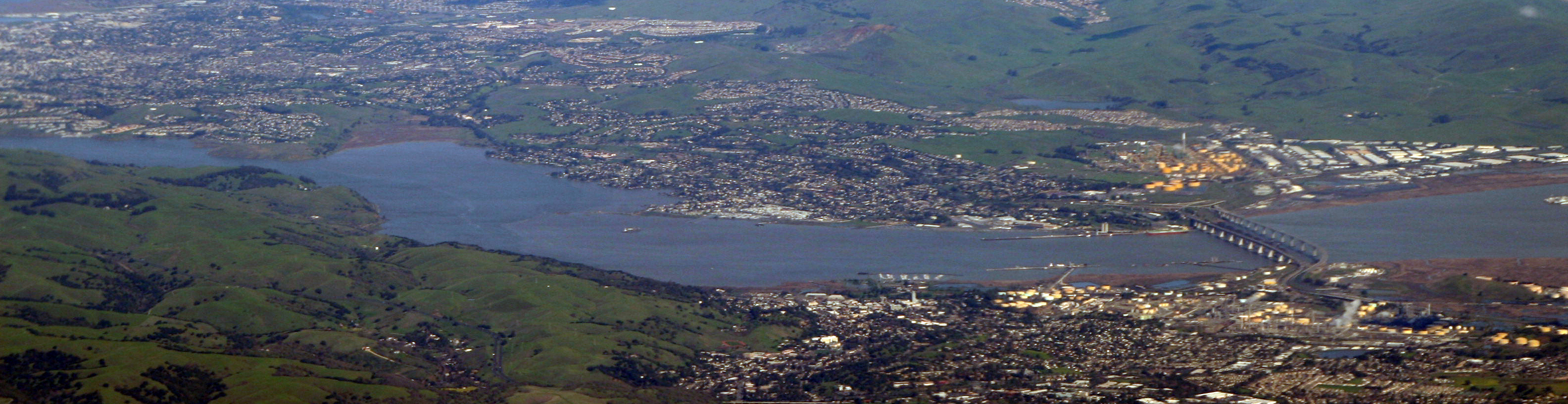
View of the Carquinez Strait with the Benicia-Martinez Bridge on the right

Historically, the Carquinez Strait was the most important obstacle for travelers on the route between San Francisco and Sacramento. The original route of the first transcontinental railroad and the original route of the Lincoln Highway entirely bypassed the strait by going the long way around to the south through Stockton and the Altamont Pass.

Today, the strait is crossed by two highway bridges: the Carquinez Bridge on Interstate 80 and the Benicia–Martinez Bridge on Interstate 680. Each highway bridge consists of two spans.

Interstate 780 connects the two highways on the northern slope of the strait. State Route 4 connects these highways south of and inland from the strait.

A rail bridge just east of the Benicia–Martinez Bridge is used by the Capitol Corridor, California Zephyr, and Coast Starlight trains.

A rail ferry, with the ferries Contra Costa and Solano, provided service across the strait from 1878 near the location of the current rail bridge until the rail bridge was built in 1930.

Tall pylons carrying power lines cross the strait as well. The Carquinez Strait Powerline Crossing was the world's first powerline crossing of a large river.

== Ship traffic ==
The channel is navigable and is used for commercial and military shipping. Deep water ship traffic bound for both the Port of Sacramento and the Port of Stockton traverse the strait through the Stockton Deepwater Shipping Channel and Sacramento Deep Water Ship Channel. Carquinez Strait is part of the Baldwin Deepwater Shipping Channel.

== Formation of delta ==
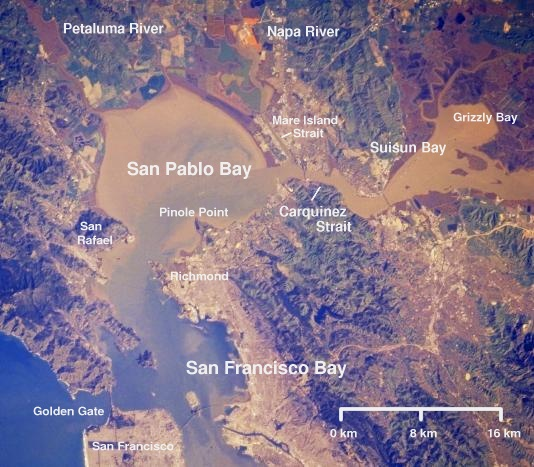
Annotated satellite image of the San Francisco Bay Area, featuring San Pablo Bay and the Carquinez Strait, 2004

The narrow gap in the Coast Range that forms the strait has led to the formation of the San Joaquin–Sacramento River Delta, an inverted river delta, upstream of it, a rare geological feature. The strait is too small to allow the passage of huge amounts of floodwaters created during years with heavy rainfall or snowmelt events. Because the Delta area is the first to fill and last to drain in a flood event, silt and soil have more time to drop out of suspension, creating the inverted river delta feature.

== Saltwater intrusion ==
Seawater is more dense than fresh water because of its higher concentration of salts. Under stable conditions, this means that an invisible boundary forms where two such streams meet, as where the fresh water from Sacramento and San Joaquin Rivers meet the sea water contained in the San Francisco Bay.

By the early 20th century, farmers in the Sacramento-San Joaquin Delta, who depended on irrigating their fields with fresh water from the two rivers noticed an increase in salinity farther inland than before. It became obvious that fresh water was being pumped out of the Delta faster than it could be replenished by rain and snow during the wet season. Farmers, businessmen and politicians complained that allowing fresh water to flow to the ocean was wasteful. While many solutions were proposed, few appeared practical. A political consensus formed that damming the Carquinez Strait should solve the seawater intrusion problem.

In September 1923, the California Legislature appropriated $10,000 (equivalent to $189,000 today) for a saltwater dam survey. The Federal government added a $20,000 contribution ($378,000 today) through the US Reclamation Service. (Note: The U.S. Reclamation Service was removed from the U.S. Geological Survey (USGS) in 1907 and reestablished within the Department of the Interior. In 1923, the Reclamation Service was renamed as the United States Bureau of Reclamation (USBR), by which it is now known.) Under Reclamation Service rules, another $10,000 needed to be raised from local supporters of the project. The necessary money was raised by March 1924, and the first of three site surveys was announced.

The first survey was at Army Point, near Benicia, which was the preferred site based on preliminary studies. The second choice was Dillon Point, near Southampton Bay, while the third survey was at Point San Pablo, near Richmond. The three surveys were completed by the end of 1924. However, it took four years to complete the decision-making process that officially named Army Point as the future dam site. Still more wrangling in the legislature was required before the "Salt Water Barrier" was officially adopted in May 1929, and made part of the state water conservation project. (Note: Bowen wrote that later in 1929, some reports indicated that the proposed dam would not store sufficient water to satisfy the projected needs of industry and agriculture.)

On January 24, 1930, with the Great Depression taking hold, President Herbert Hoover cancelled the Carquinez Strait project, saying that it was too costly. All efforts to revive the project failed. Years later, the Central Valley Project attempted to mitigate the effects of seawater intrusion by constructing other dams much farther inland and canals to send fresh water to the San Joaquin Valley.

== See also ==
- Carquinez Strait Regional Shoreline
- Lake Corcoran
- Saltwater intrusion
