= San Francisco Estuary Institute =

American nonprofit research institute

Coordinates: 37.8997°N 122.3179°W

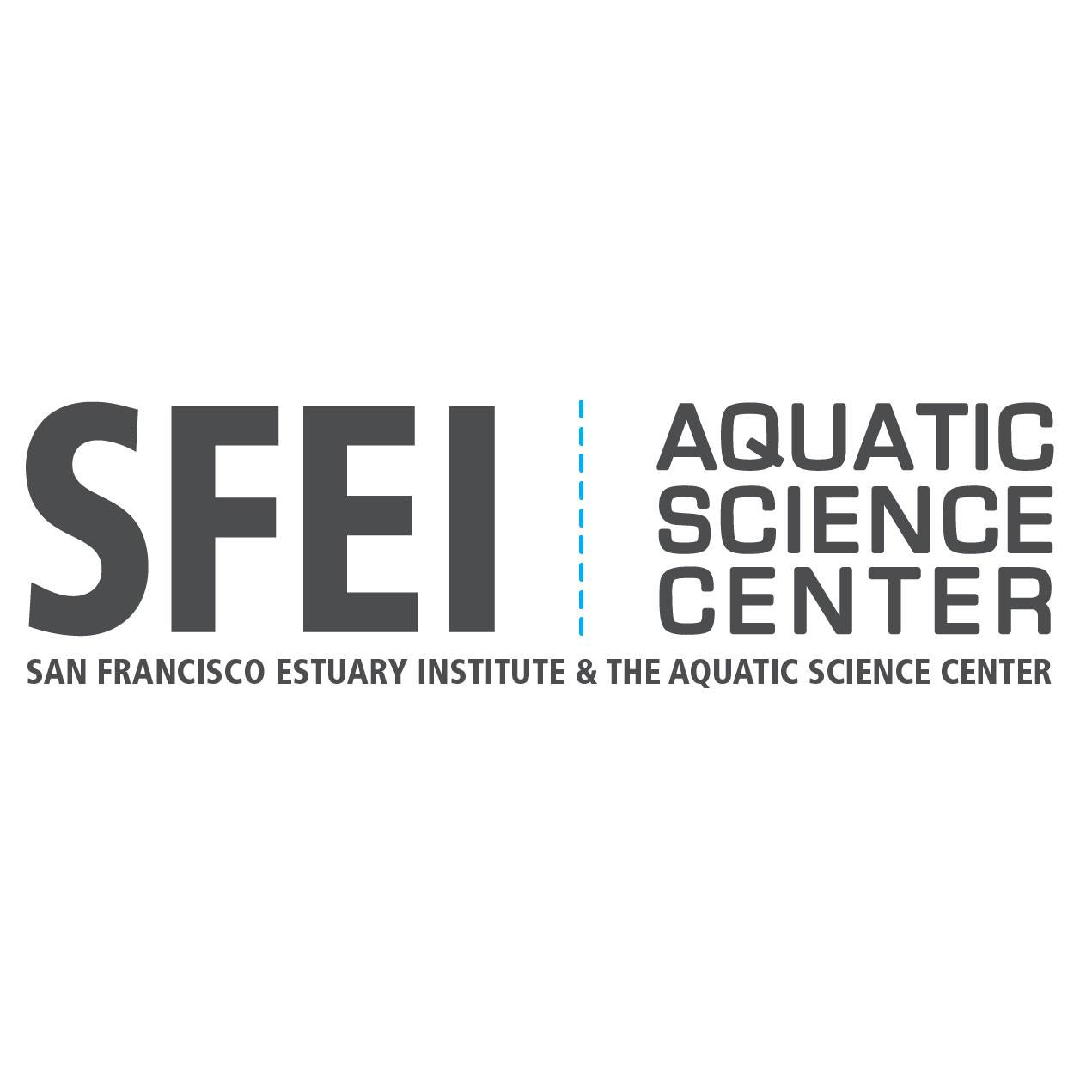
- Founded: 1992
- Type: 501(c)(3)
- Purpose: Environmental research and monitoring
- Location: Richmond, California, US
- Region served: San Francisco Bay Area
- Key people: Ann Hayden, Board Chair; Emily Corwin, Executive Director
- Budget: $13.9M (2023)
- Revenue: Government and private sector contracts, grants, donations
- Website: sfei.org

The San Francisco Estuary Institute (SFEI) is a nonprofit research institute focusing on the estuaries and ecosystems of San Francisco Bay and Northern California. SFEI was created in 1992 in order to coordinate integrated research and monitoring of the Bay. SFEI administers the Aquatic Science Center, a joint powers authority (JPA), which is an agency formed when multiple government agencies have a common mission that can be better achieved by pooling resources and knowledge. SFEI's precursor was the Aquatic Habitat Institute, created in 1986.

== Research ==
=== Water quality monitoring ===
SFEI has managed the Regional Monitoring Program for Water Quality in San Francisco Bay (RMP) since its beginning in 1993. Scientists monitor pollutants in water, sediment, and in Bay wildlife, including bivalves, fish, bird eggs, and harbor seals. Samples are analyzed for mercury, PCBs, pesticides, metals, and a variety of contaminants of emerging concern.

Thousands of man-made chemicals are found in Bay water, sediment, and organisms. For many of these, there is little or no data on their impacts on the environment or human health, and they are not regulated by state or federal law. These are often referred to as "contaminants of emerging concern" or CECs. SFEI has studied these chemicals in the Bay since 2001. Scientists have identified the following most likely to have a negative impact on Bay wildlife: PFOS, the pesticide fipronil, nonylphenols and nonylphenol ethoxylates.

Information developed by the RMP is used by state regulators to set Total Maximum Daily Loads. RMP data has also been used in the development of fish consumption advisories by California's Department of Public Health. Levels of PCBs and mercury in certain species of sportfish in San Francisco Bay exceed safe levels for human consumption. The RMP collected data on copper in stormwater, which is toxic to aquatic organisms at elevated concentrations. These data contributed to the passage of California Senate Bill 346, also known as the California Motor Vehicle Brake Friction Material Law. This law supports the development of alternative, less toxic materials for use in brake pads.

=== Ecology ===
SFEI scientists have made wide use of the techniques of historical ecology, which incorporates information from historical maps and other records to learn how and ecosystems have changed over time. This information is used to help guide restoration and management plans for wetlands and other landscapes.

SFEI scientists contribute to the San Francisco Bay Wetlands Monitoring Program, helping to guide the South Bay Salt Ponds Restoration Project, a $1 billion, 50-year effort to restore thousands of acres of former San Francisco Bay Salt Ponds to tidal wetlands.

=== Information Technology ===
SFEI staff have collaborated with NASA scientists to develop an early-warning system for harmful algal blooms, based on satellite remote sensing data and artificial intelligence.

== History ==
In 1987, the San Francisco Estuary Project (SFEP, a state and federal cooperative program) began creating a Comprehensive Conservation and Management Plan (CCMP) for the San Francisco Estuary, involving over 100 stakeholders. The CCMP led to the establishment of the San Francisco Estuary Institute (SFEI) and the Regional Monitoring Program (RMP).

In 1992, the San Francisco Regional Water Quality Control Board mandated the implementation of a regional pollutant monitoring program in the Bay. Under the federal Clean Water Act and the state Porter-Cologne Water Quality Control Act, polluters must have a discharge permit, and must monitor discharges (compliance monitoring) and in the water body near their discharge (receiving water impacts monitoring). This results in a patchwork of data that is not well-suited for science or management. By contrast, coordinated monitoring programs can gather information relevant to managers and with clear scientific objectives. Because cooperative programs can be more efficient and useful, several such programs have been created in the United States, for example for the Chesapeake Bay, in Puget Sound, and the Southern California Bight.

In 1993, the Aquatic Habitat Institute was reorganized as SFEI and the RMP officially began, using previous pilot studies to guide its monitoring efforts. The RMP annual budget has grown from $1.2 million in 1993 to $5.4 million in 2024.

In the early 1990s, California regulatory agencies established numeric criteria for several pollutants, but little was known about whether waterways exceeded these criteria. Early work by the RMP focused on sampling water in the Bay to determine its status, and whether pollutant concentrations met or exceeded standards. In subsequent years, the RMP has expanded its objectives to include estimating inputs ("loads") of pollutants to the Bay, understanding how pollutants enter waterways ("pathways"), and effects of pollutants on wildlife. These goals assist regulators in developing Total Maximum Daily Loads and issuing discharge permits required by the US Clean Water Act and California's Porter-Cologne Water Quality Control Act.

SFEI is located in Richmond, California. SFEI's original location (in 1993) was in Oakland, California, with subsequent offices at the Richmond Field Station before moving to the present location in 2007.

== Member Agencies ==
The Regional Monitoring Program for Water Quality in San Francisco Bay (RMP) is funded by permitted dischargers including oil refineries, industrial facilities, dredgers, wastewater treatment facilities, and municipal stormwater management programs. For a full list, see Appendix A in the RMP charter. Members participate in the RMP in exchange for some regulatory relief, or exemption from conducting some monitoring that would normally be required under the Clean Water Act and the National Pollutant Discharge Elimination System. Participants elect representatives to serve on various committees, through which they oversee the program's finances, guide its management, and provide input and peer review of the science. In addition, the RMP has over a dozen science advisors, nationally recognized experts in various fields of environmental science.

== See also ==
- San Francisco Estuary Partnership
- The Bay Institute
- San Francisco Bay Conservation and Development Commission
- Save the Bay
- San Francisco Baykeeper
- Southern California Coastal Water Research Project
