= San Francisco Bay Area Water Trail =

Water trail in California

The San Francisco Bay Area Water Trail is a growing network of launch and landing sites that allow people in non-motorized small boats and beachable sail craft such as kayaks, canoes, dragon boats, stand up paddle and windsurf boards, to safely enjoy San Francisco Bay through single and multiple-day trips. The Water Trail is enhancing Bay Area communities’ connections to the Bay and creating new linkages to existing shoreline open spaces and other regional trails as well as increasing education about personal safety, navigational safety, and appropriate boating behavior near sensitive wildlife species and shoreline habitat. The Water Trail is implemented under the leadership of the California Coastal Conservancy in close collaboration with the Association of Bay Area Governments, the San Francisco Bay Conservation and Development Commission, and the California Department of Boating and Waterways.

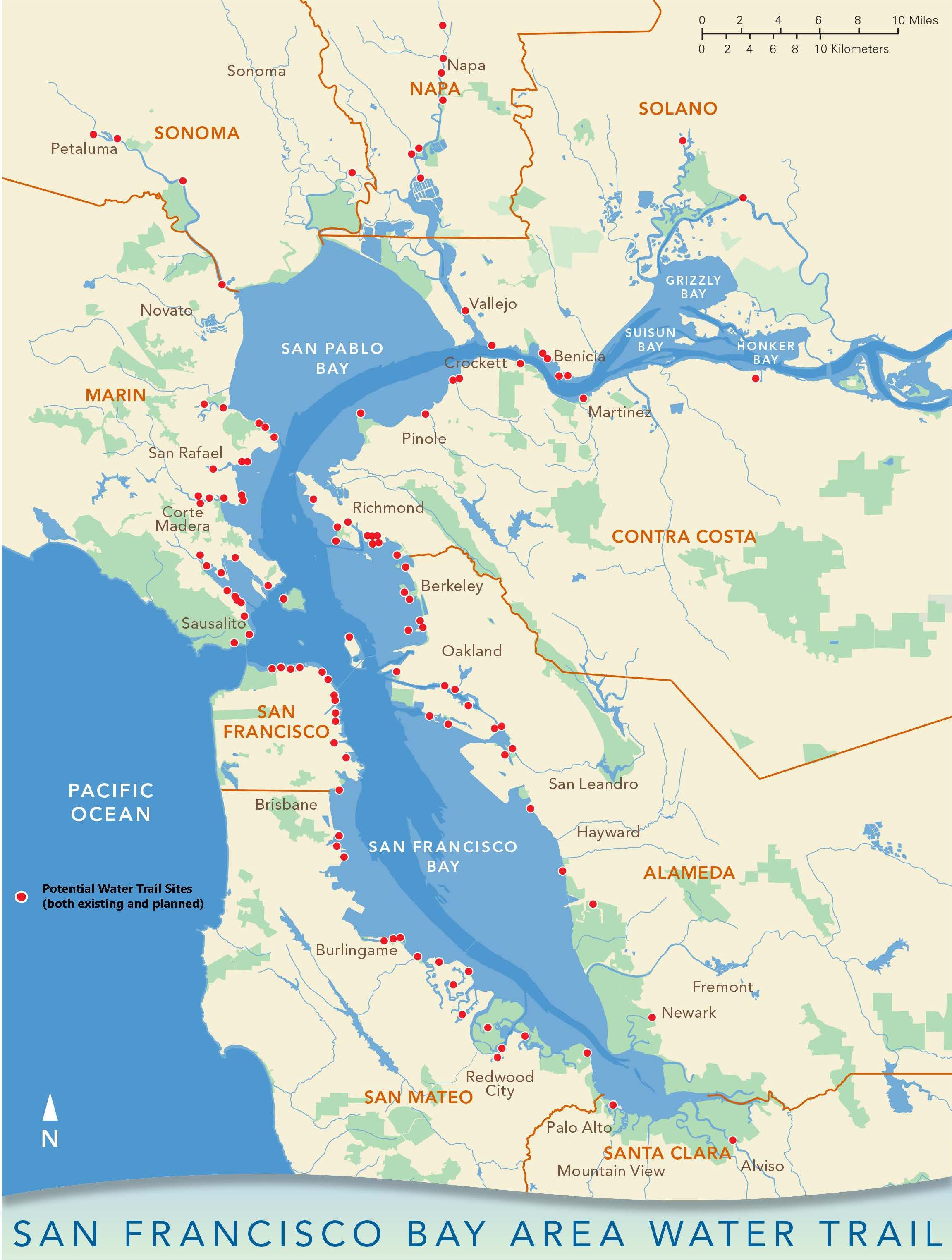
San Francisco Bay Area Water Trail Vision Map, Location San Francisco Bay Area, United States, Use kayaking, canoeing, outrigger canoeing, rowing (sport), whaleboat, dragon boat, stand up paddle surfing windsurfing, kitesurfing, Birdwatching, Environmental Education

== History ==
The Water Trail was created largely through the efforts of Bay Access, Inc., a dedicated group of non-motorized-small-boat enthusiasts who recognized the need and benefit for this unique regional trail. The California legislature established the Water Trail with the passage of the San Francisco Bay Area Water Trail Act on 22 September 2005. The Water Trail Act directed the San Francisco Bay Conservation and Development Commission, in coordination with other agencies and organizations, to conduct a public planning process for the Water Trail. As a result of this effort, the San Francisco Bay Area Water Trail Plan was prepared on 7 September 2007. The California State Coastal Conservancy led the environmental review of the Water Trail Plan under the California Environmental Quality Act and certified the Final Environmental Impact Report (FEIR) on 17 March 2011. Changes directed by the FEIR were incorporated into the Water Trail Plan and on 17 March 2011 the Conservancy adopted the Enhanced Water Trail Plan. The Water Trail Act directed the Coastal Conservancy to be the lead for implementation of the Water Trail. The Enhanced Water Trail Plan recommends 112 existing and planned launch and destination sites for inclusion into the Water Trail network, although the final trail network may not include all 112 sites or may include additional sites not initially identified.

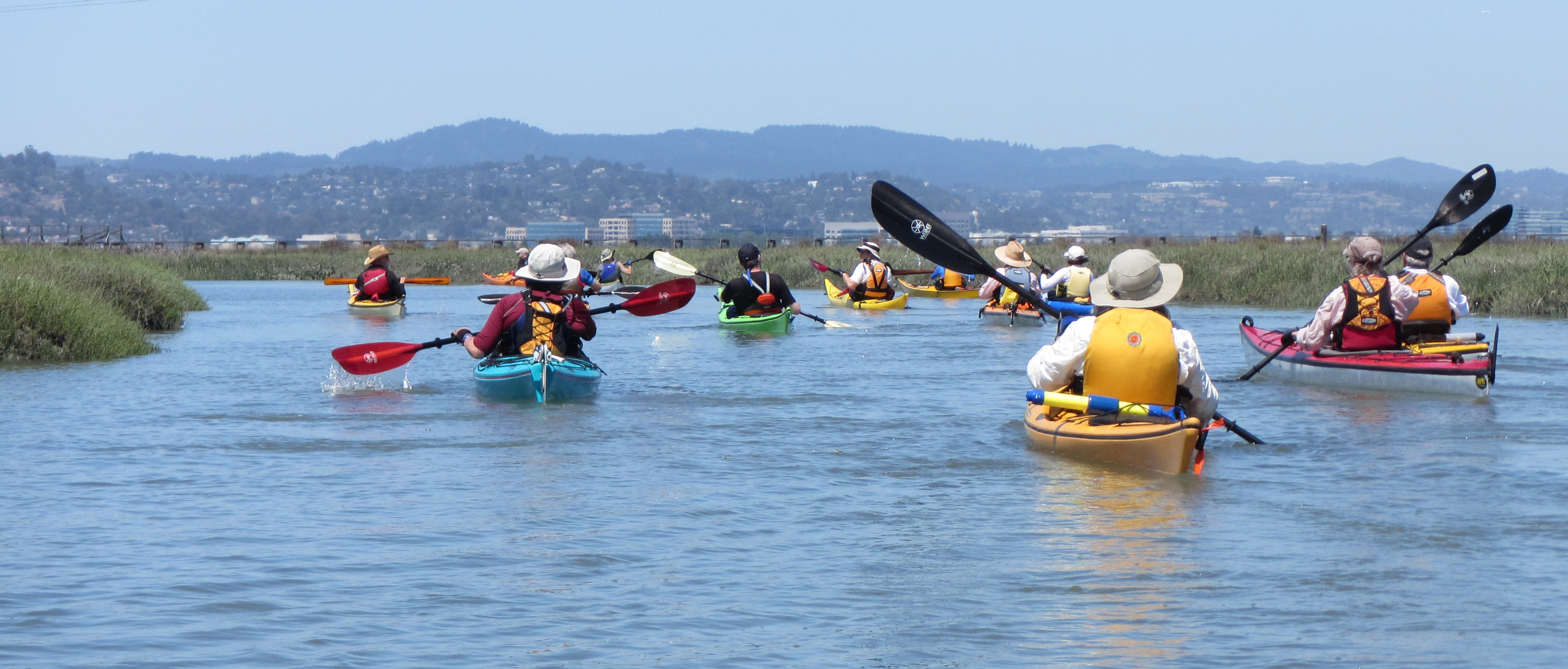
Kayakers in Redwood City, California

== Purpose ==
The competing pressures of increased non-motorized small boat use and increased development in the Bay Area point to the benefits that a planned and coordinated approach to non-motorized small boat access around the Bay could provide. Natural deterioration and a lack of funding to pay for repairs could lead to the loss of existing non-motorized small boat access locations over time. Without an overarching program, such as the Water Trail, to help find funding to replace or improve deteriorating sites, additional access sites may be lost. The Water Trail is expected to provide the following benefits or serve the following needs:

- Create a coordinated set of access locations allowing for single point, multiple point, and multi-day excursions
- Improve existing boat launch facilities and develop more overnight facilities, including camping
- Promote safe boating practices for users of non-motorized small boats
- Reduce impacts to sensitive wildlife and habitat and other resources through education
- Foster stewardship of the Bay and of trailhead facilities
- Increase opportunities to recreate close to home and use public transportation rather than private vehicles
- Reduce user conflicts among recreational users of launch sites through planning and facility design
- Develop design guidelines for non-motorized small boat facilities that address the shoreline topography of San Francisco Bay and serve non-motorized small boat users with physical disabilities
- Provide funding, publicity, and, indirectly, possible economic growth to site owners/managers through a variety of business opportunities related to water-oriented recreation (e.g., boat storage, rental concessions, nearby restaurants and hotels)

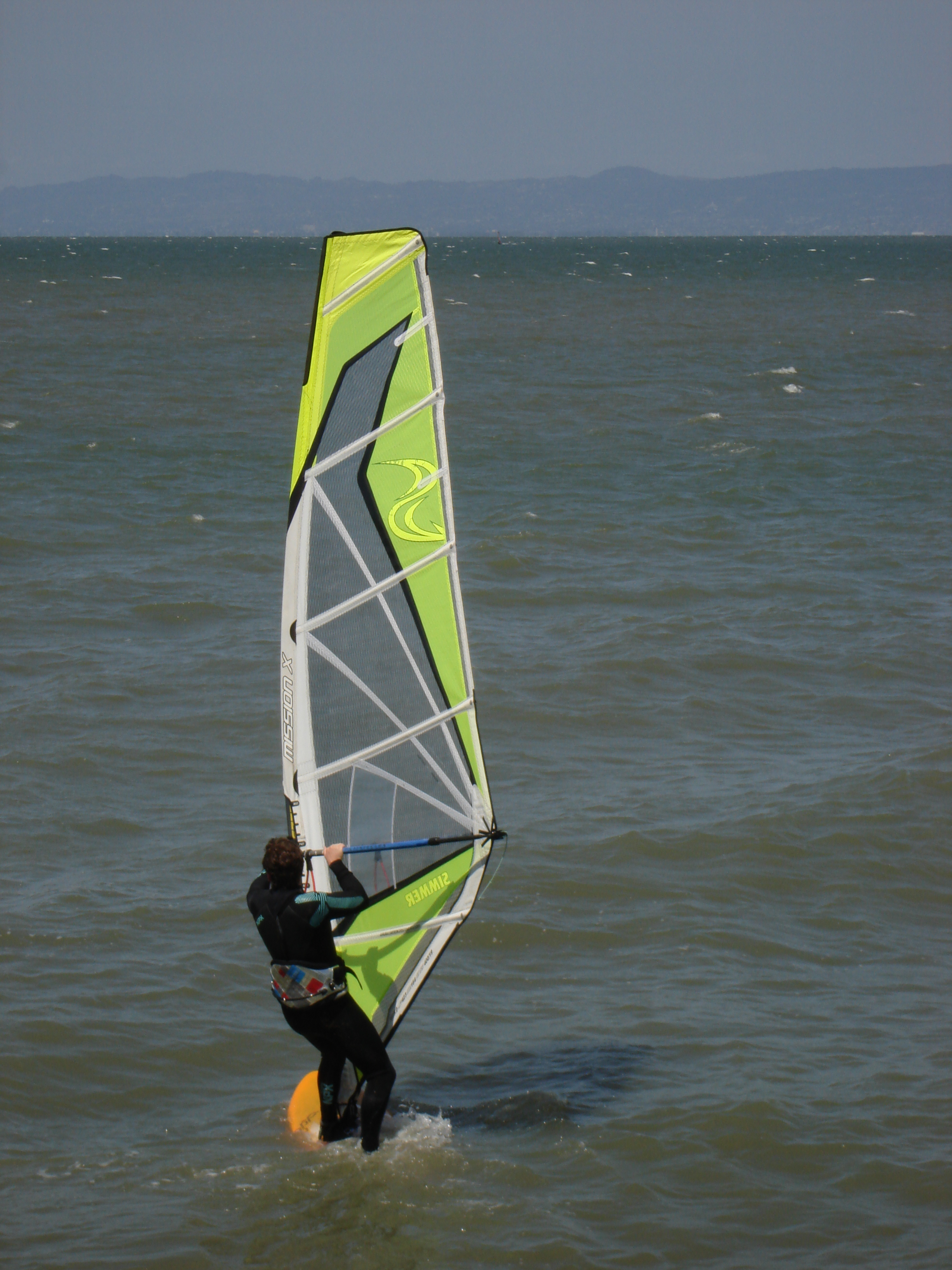
Windsurfer in San Mateo County, California

== See also ==
- San Francisco Bay Trail
