= DBW (disambiguation) =

DBW may refer to:

- Decibel watt, SI measurement of signal strength and intensity
- DBW (band), an American heavy metal band
- Drive by wire, the automotive technology
- Bankan Tey Dogon, the ISO 639-3 code dbw
- Dutch Broadway, a major road in Nassau County, New York
- California Division of Boating and Waterways
