= San Francisco Bay Restoration Authority =

California government agency

The San Francisco Bay Restoration Authority (SFBRA) is a government agency dedicated to preserving and restoring San Francisco Bay and its shoreline. SFBRA was created by the California legislature in 2008. It is headquartered in Oakland. In 2016, the SFBRA placed a funding measure on the June ballots in all 9 San Francisco Bay Area counties. The measure, known as the San Francisco Bay Clean Water, Pollution Prevention and Habitat Restoration Program or Measure AA, passed by the required 2/3 majority in the combined county vote. The measure provides for $500 million in funding for the authority, to be used to restore wetlands and mitigate expected sea level rise.

The Authority plans to release the first request for proposals in September 2017 and make the first round of grants in early 2018.

== See also ==
- Save The Bay
- Hydrography of the San Francisco Bay Area
- San Francisco Bay Conservation and Development Commission
- California State Coastal Conservancy
