= Bay Area Council =

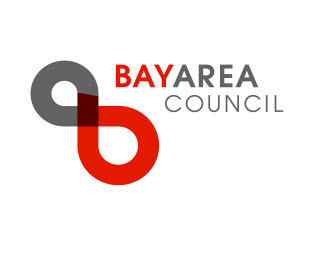
Bay Area Council

The Bay Area Council is a business association in San Francisco, founded in 1945, and dedicated to economic development in the San Francisco Bay Area. At its inception in the post WWII years, members included Wells Fargo, Bank of America, the Transamerica Corporation, Standard Oil of California, Pacific Gas and Electric, Bechtel, Kaiser Industries, Clorox and others. By the late 1940s, the Council was an early environmental watchdog. In the 1950s, the Council promoted a regional mass transit system that eventually became BART.

In 1965, the Council sponsored legislation creating the Bay Conservation and Development Commission. In 1970, they helped to create the Metropolitan Transportation Commission.
