= San Francisco Bay Conservation and Development Commission =

California state commission

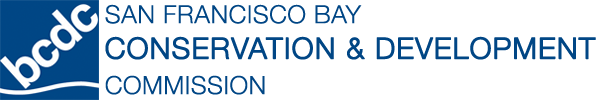

Agency overview
- Formed: September 17, 1965
- Type: State commission
- Jurisdiction: San Francisco Bay
- Headquarters: Bay Area Metro Center, San Francisco
- Employees: under 50
- Annual budget: $12M
- Agency executives: Larry Goldzband, Executive Director; Steven Goldbeck, Deputy Executive Secretary
- Parent agency: California Natural Resources Agency
- Website: BCDC.ca.gov

The San Francisco Bay Conservation and Development Commission (BCDC) is a California state commission dedicated to the protection, enhancement and responsible use of the San Francisco Bay. It holds jurisdiction over almost the entirety of the Bay, including the reaches into the Sacramento River, Coyote Creek and the Petaluma River Additionally, the commission oversees the San Francisco Bay Salt Ponds and the Suisun Marsh that connects to the ports of Stockton. BCDC has the authority to administer legal enforcement action and escalate violations of McAteer-Petris Act to the California Attorney General's Office.

== History ==
The Commission was created by California's McAteer-Petris Act, which the legislature passed on September 17, 1965. The legislation was promoted by the Bay Area Council, a local business organization. It is the first regional government entity created for an urban area by legislative action.

The Save San Francisco Bay Association was started by citizens outraged by the dramatic loss of the bay through dikes and landfills as well as pollution. By the 1960s, filling had reduced the bay from 680 square miles (1,800 km^{2}) to just 400 square miles (1,000 km^{2}) of highly contaminated water.

== Coordinating Agencies ==
BCDC is part of the Bay Area Regional Collaborative which includes the Metropolitan Transportation Commission, Association of Bay Area Governments, and Bay Area Air Quality Management District. This multi-agency regional committee allows for cross-jurisdictional work on projects such as Resilient Bay Area and Carbon Free Future In 2020, Commission staff issued a report on the potential impacts of rising sea level.

Their work includes advocacy for a San Francisco Bay Area Water Trail, for beachable nonmotorized watercraft to navigate the bay and also shutting down harbors like Westpoint in Redwood City.

== See also ==
- San Francisco Bay Restoration Authority
