= San Francisco Bay =

Shallow estuary on the coast of California, US

- Location within California
- Coordinates: 37°40′N 122°16′W
- Type: Bay
- River sources: Sacramento River; San Joaquin River; Petaluma River; Napa River; Guadalupe River
- Ocean/sea sources: Pacific Ocean
- Basin countries: United States
- Max. length: 97 km (60 mi)
- Max. width: 19 km (12 mi)
- Surface area: 400–1,600 mi^{2} (1,000–4,100 km^{2})
- Average depth: 12–15 ft (3.7–4.6 m)
- Max. depth: 372 ft (113 m)
- Settlements: Oakland; San Francisco; San Jose

Ramsar Wetland
- Official name: San Francisco Bay/Estuary (SFBE)
- Designated: February 2, 2013
- Reference no.: 2097

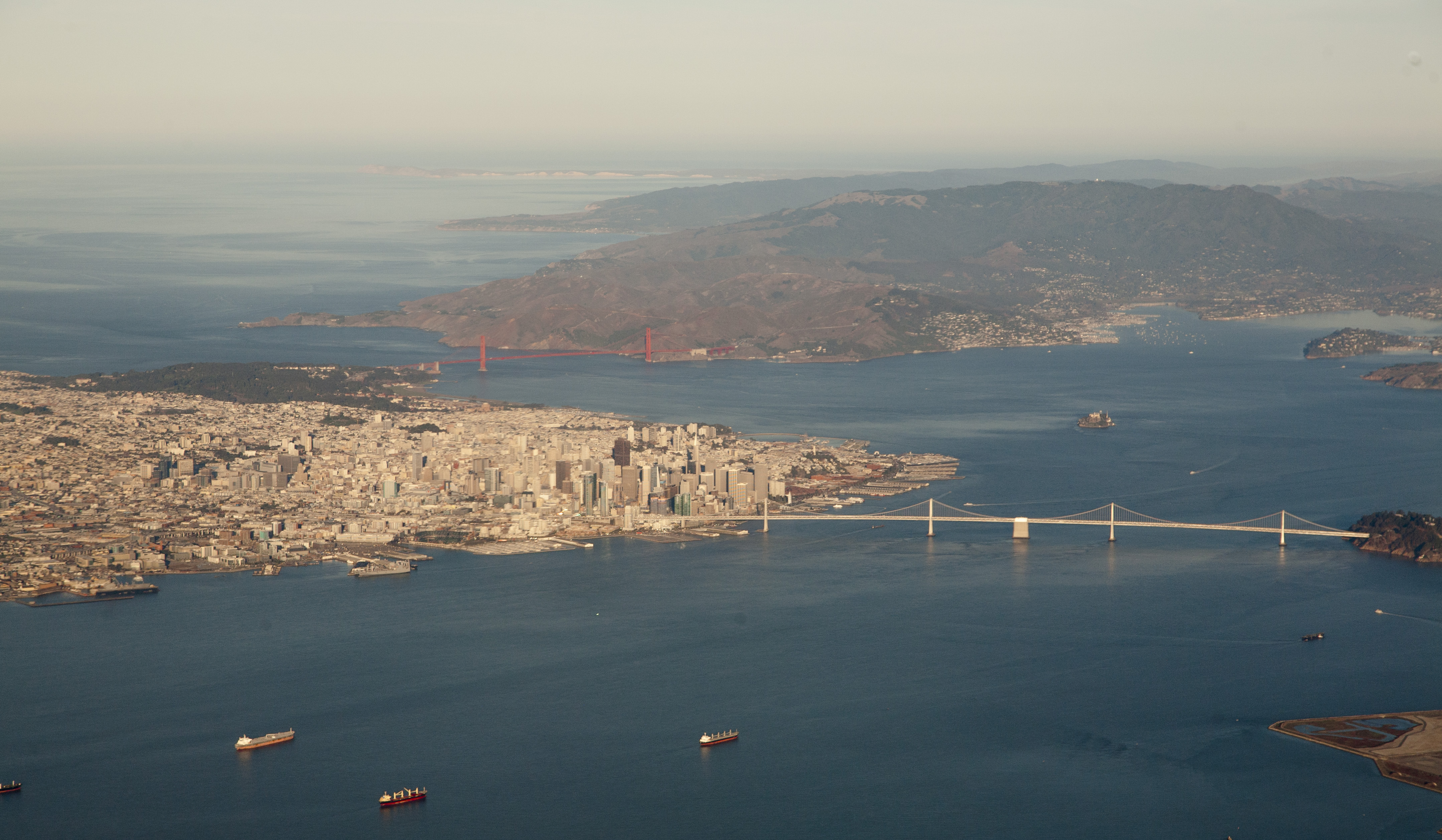
Aerial panorama of the northern Bay, the Bay Bridge, Golden Gate, and Marin Headlands on a clear morning. November 2014 photo by Doc Searls.

San Francisco Bay is a large tidal estuary in the U.S. state of California, which gives its name to the San Francisco Bay Area. It is dominated by the cities of Oakland, San Francisco, and San Jose.

San Francisco Bay drains water from approximately 40 percent of California. Water from the Sacramento and San Joaquin rivers, and from the Sierra Nevada mountains, flow into Suisun Bay, which then travels through the Carquinez Strait to meet with the Napa River at the entrance to San Pablo Bay, which connects at its south end to San Francisco Bay. It then connects to the Pacific Ocean via the Golden Gate strait. However, this entire group of interconnected bays is often called San Francisco Bay. The bay was designated a Ramsar Wetland of International Importance on February 2, 2013, and the Port of Oakland on the bay is one of the busiest cargo ports on the west coast.

== Geography ==
The bay covers somewhere between 400 and 1,600 square miles (1,000–4,000 km^{2}), depending on which sub-bays (such as San Pablo Bay), estuaries, wetlands, and so on are included in the measurement. The main part of the bay measures three to twelve miles (5–19 km) wide east-to-west and somewhere between 48 miles (77 km)^{1} and 60 miles (97 km)^{2} north-to-south.

San Francisco Bay is the second-largest estuary on the Pacific coast of the Americas, following the Salish Sea in Washington State and British Columbia, Canada.

The bay was navigable as far south as San Jose until the 1850s, when hydraulic mining released massive amounts of sediment from the rivers that settled in those parts of the bay that had little or no current. Later, wetlands and inlets were deliberately filled in, reducing the bay's size since the mid-19th century by as much as one third. Recently, large areas of wetlands have been restored, further confusing the issue of the bay's size. Despite its value as a waterway and harbor, many thousands of acres of marshy wetlands at the edges of the bay were, for many years, considered wasted space. As a result, soil excavated for building projects or dredged from channels was often dumped onto the wetlands and other parts of the bay as landfill.

From the mid-19th century through the late 20th century, more than a third of the original bay was filled and often built on. The deep, damp soil in these areas is subject to soil liquefaction during earthquakes, and most of the major damage close to the bay in the Loma Prieta earthquake of 1989 occurred to structures on these areas.

The Marina District of San Francisco, hard hit by the 1989 earthquake, was built on fill that had been placed there for the Panama-Pacific International Exposition, although liquefaction did not occur on a large scale. In the 1990s, San Francisco International Airport proposed filling in hundreds more acres to extend its overcrowded international runways in exchange for purchasing other parts of the bay and converting them back to wetlands. The idea was, and remains, controversial. (For further details, see the "Bay fill and depth profile" section.)

There are five large islands in San Francisco Bay. Alameda, the largest island, was created when a shipping lane was cut to form the Port of Oakland in 1901. It is now a suburban community. Angel Island was known as "Ellis Island West" because it served as the entry point for immigrants from East Asia. It is now a state park accessible by ferry. Mountainous Yerba Buena Island is pierced by a tunnel linking the east and west spans of the San Francisco–Oakland Bay Bridge. Attached to the north is the artificial and flat Treasure Island, site of the 1939 Golden Gate International Exposition. From the Second World War until the 1990s, both islands served as military bases and are now being redeveloped. Isolated in the center of the bay is Alcatraz, the site of the famous federal penitentiary. The federal prison on Alcatraz Island no longer functions, but the complex is a popular tourist site. Despite its name, Mare Island in the northern part of the bay is a peninsula rather than an island.

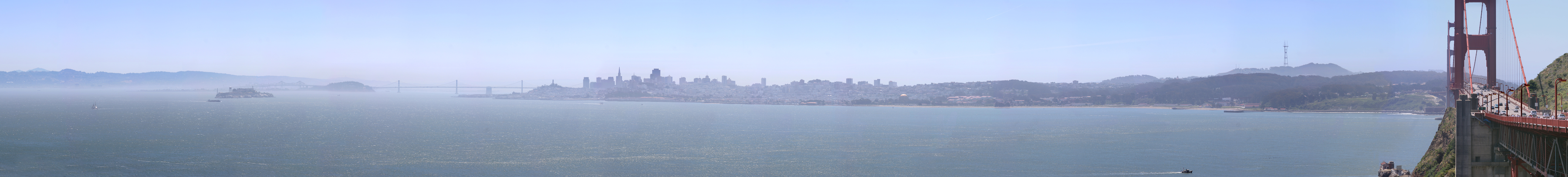
Panorama of San Francisco Bay, and the city skyline seen from Marin County in the Golden Gate National Recreation Area

== Geology ==
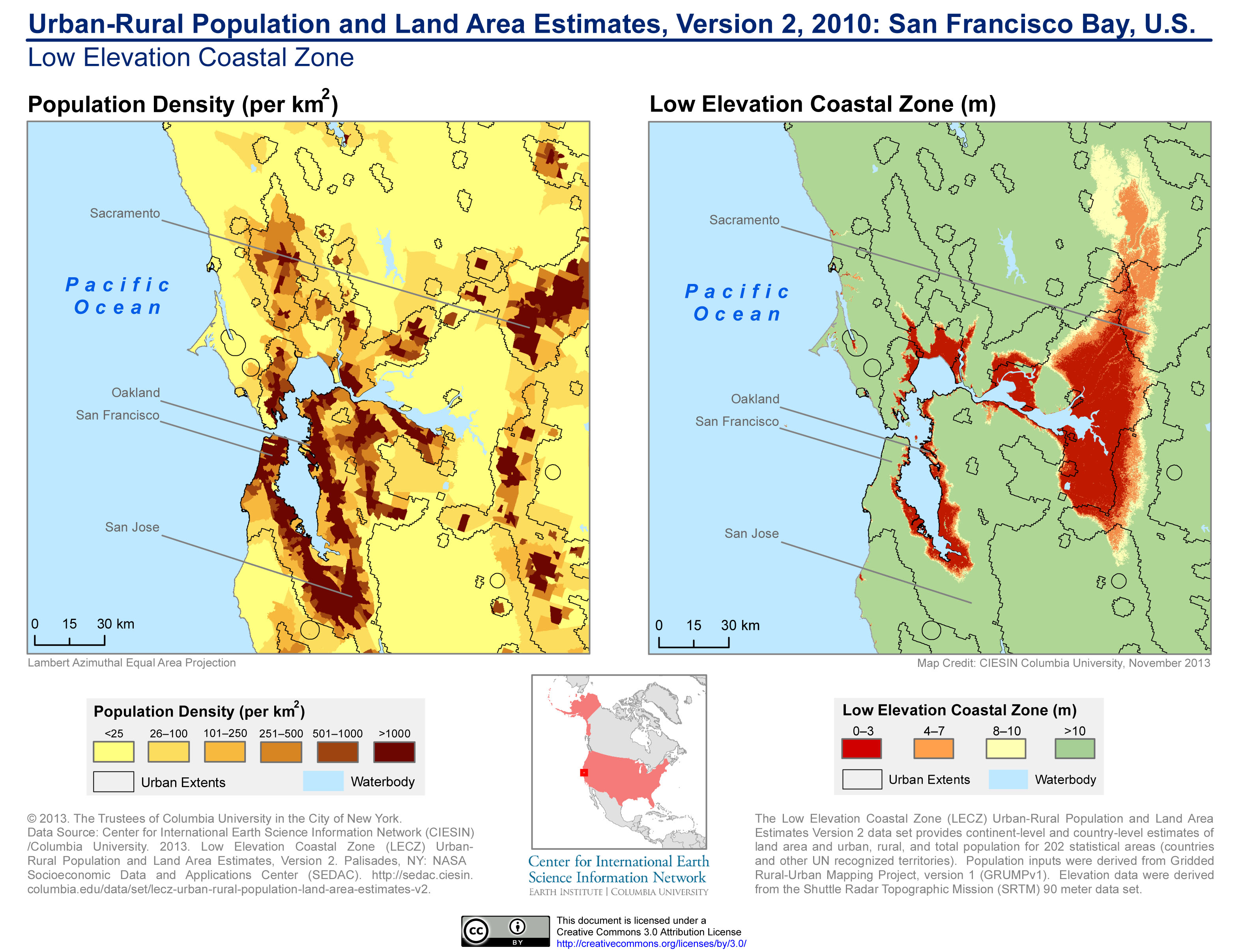
Population density and low-elevation coastal zones in San Francisco Bay (2010). San Francisco Bay is especially vulnerable to sea level rise.

San Francisco Bay is thought to represent a down-warping of the Earth's crust between the San Andreas Fault to the west and the Hayward Fault to the east, though the precise nature of this remains under study. About 560,000 years ago, a tectonic shift caused the large inland Lake Corcoran to spill out from the central valley and through the Carquinez Strait, carving out sediment and forming canyons in what is now the northern part of San Francisco Bay and Golden Gate strait.

San Francisco Bay has been filled and emptied of sea water many times during the Pleistocene in accordance with sea level changes caused by glacial advances and retreats. During the Wisconsin Glaciation, between 15,000 and about 10,000 years ago, the basin which is now filled by San Francisco Bay was a large river valley with small hills, channeling the Sacramento River through the Golden Gate Strait into the ocean. When the great ice sheets began to melt, around 11,000 years ago, the sea level started to rise rapidly, by about 1 inch per year. Melting glaciers in the Sierra Nevada washed huge amounts of sediment down the Sacramento and San Joaquin rivers, which accumulated on the shores of the bay, forming huge mudflats and marshes that supported local wildlife. By 5000 BC the sea level rose 300 feet (90 m), filling the valley with water from the Pacific. The Farallon Islands are what used to be hills along the old coastline, and Potato Patch Shoal is an area of sand dunes now covered by the ocean.

== History ==
Cañizares Map of San Francisco Bay

The indigenous inhabitants of San Francisco Bay are Ohlone. In the eastern part of the bay, the native Chochenyo people called the bay ommu, in the Chochenyo language.

The bay eluded discovery by passing European mariners for centuries, "because its entrance was narrow and often fog-shrouded".

The first European to see San Francisco Bay is likely N. de Morena, who was left at New Albion at Drakes Bay in Marin County, California, by Sir Francis Drake in 1579 and then walked to Mexico.

The first recorded European discovery of San Francisco Bay was on November 4, 1769, when Spanish explorer Gaspar de Portolá, unable to find the Port of Monterey, continued north close to what is now Pacifica and reached the summit of the 1,200-foot-high (370 m) Sweeney Ridge, now marked as the place where he first sighted San Francisco Bay. Portolá and his party did not realize what they had discovered, thinking they had arrived at a large arm of what is now called Drakes Bay. At the time, Drakes Bay went by the name Bahia de San Francisco and thus both bodies of water became associated with the name. Eventually, the larger, more important body of water fully appropriated the name San Francisco Bay.

The first European to enter the bay is believed to have been the Spanish explorer Juan de Ayala, who passed through the Golden Gate on August 5, 1775, in his ship the San Carlos and moored in a bay of Angel Island now known as Ayala Cove. Ayala continued to explore the San Francisco Bay Area and the expedition's cartographer, José de Cañizares, gathered the information necessary to produce the first map of the area. A number of place names survive (anglicized) from that first map, including Point Reyes, Angel Island, Farallon Islands, and Alcatraz Island.

Alaskan Native sea otter hunters using Aleutian kayaks and working for the Russian–American Company entered San Francisco Bay in 1807 and again over 1810–1811. Led by the Russian Timofei Nikitich Tarakanov, these hunting raids probably wiped out sea otters in the bay. Thousands of sea otter skins were taken to Sitka, then Guangzhou (Canton), China, where they commanded a high price.

The United States seized the region from Mexico during the Mexican–American War (1846–1848). On February 2, 1848, the Mexican province of Alta California was annexed to the United States with the signing of the Treaty of Guadalupe Hidalgo. A year and a half later, California requested to join the United States on December 3, 1849, and was accepted as the 31st State of the Union on September 9, 1850.

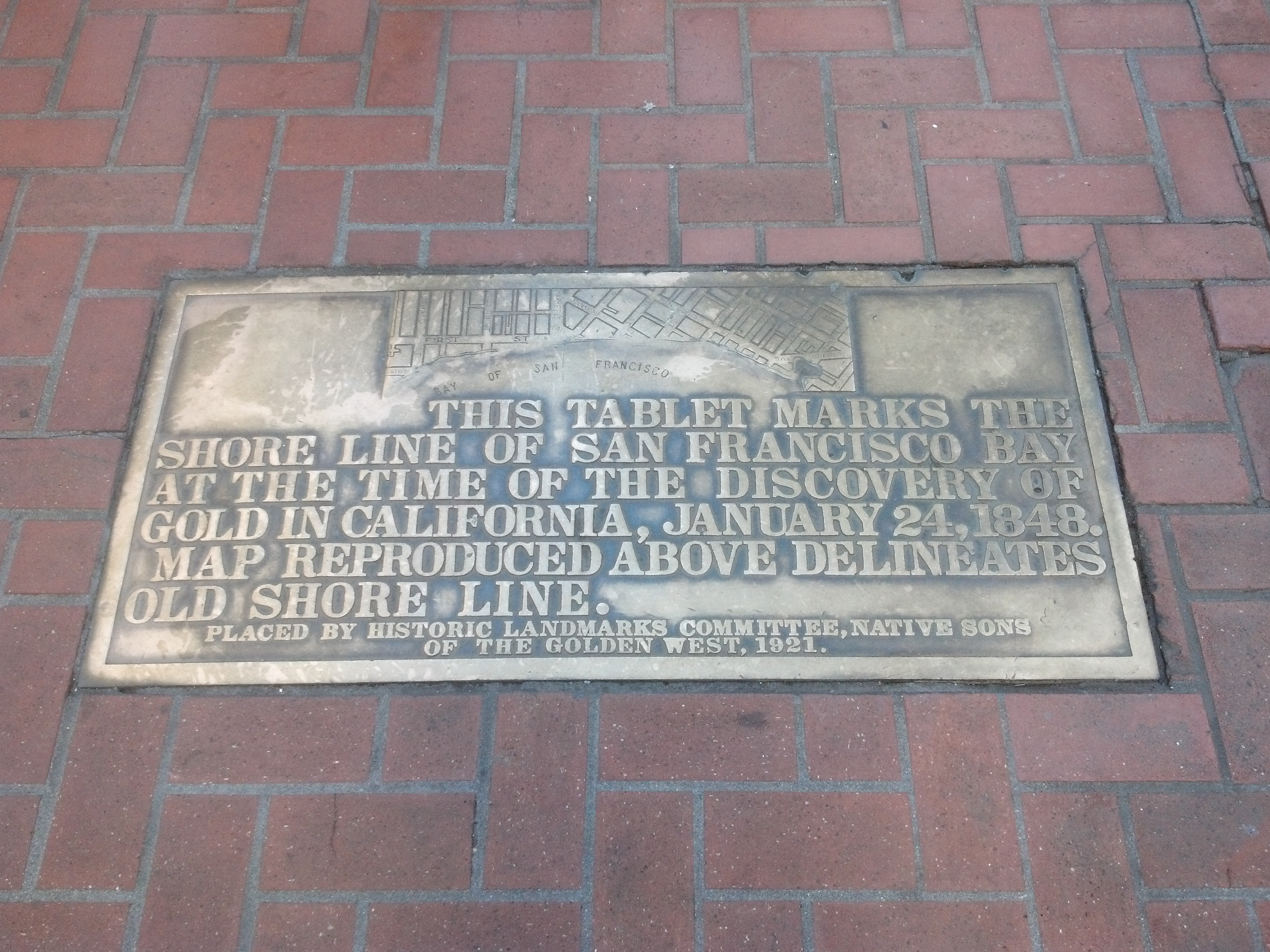
San Francisco Bay shoreline tablet

In 1921, a tablet was dedicated by a group of men in downtown San Francisco, marking the site of the original shoreline. The tablet reads: "This tablet marks the shore line of San Francisco Bay at the time of the discovery of gold in California, January 24, 1848. Map reproduced above delineates old shore line. Placed by the Historic Landmarks committee, Native Sons of the Golden West, 1921."

The bay became the center of American settlement and commerce in the Far West through most of the remainder of the 19th century. During the California Gold Rush (1848–1855), San Francisco Bay suddenly became one of the world's great seaports, dominating shipping in the American West until the last years of the 19th century. The bay's regional importance increased further when the first transcontinental railroad was connected to its western terminus at Alameda on September 6, 1869. The terminus was switched to the Oakland Long Wharf two months later on November 8, 1869.

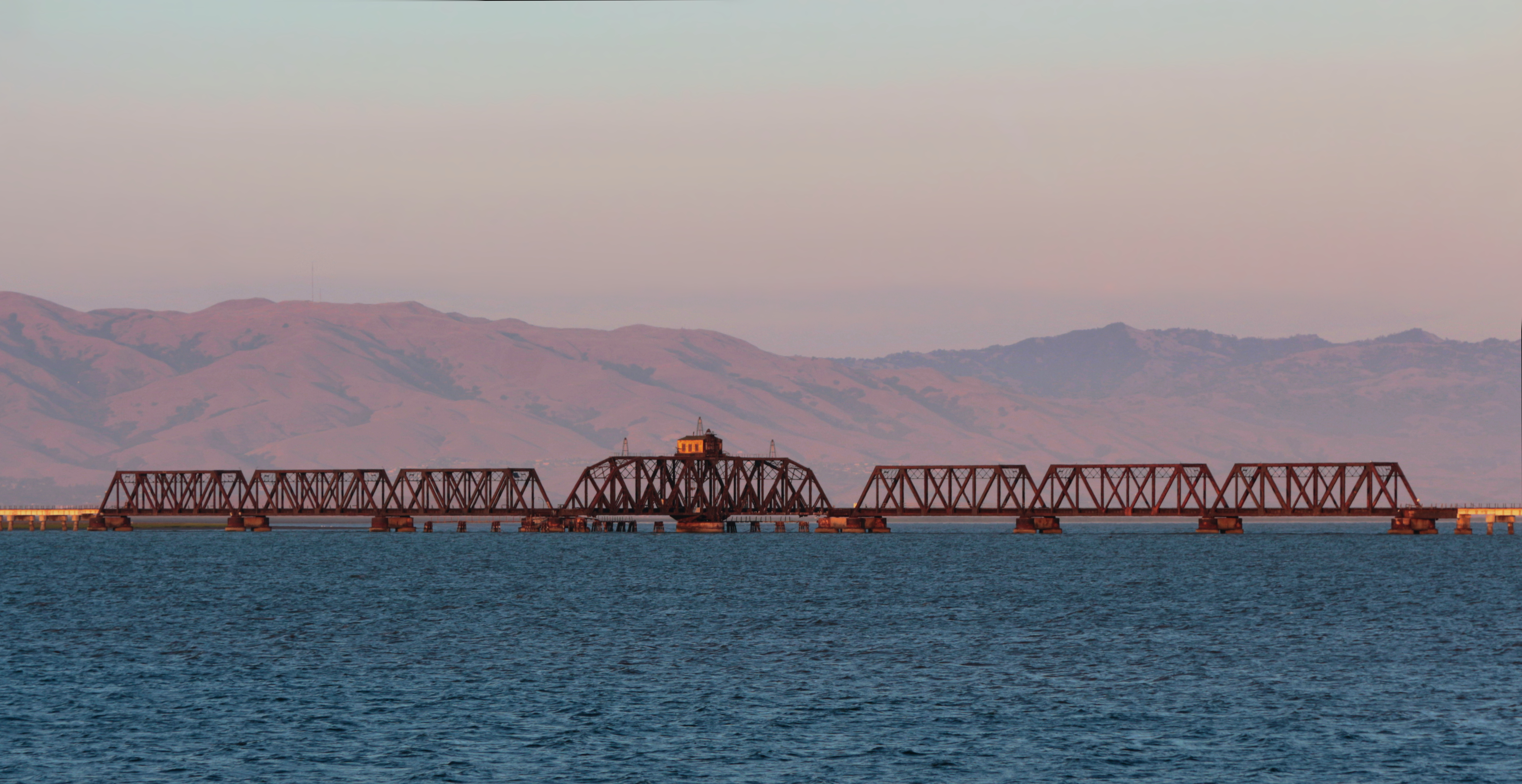
The Dumbarton Rail Bridge

In 1910, the Southern Pacific railroad company built the Dumbarton Rail Bridge, the first bridge crossing San Francisco Bay. The first automobile crossing was the Dumbarton Bridge, completed in January 1927. More crossings were later constructed – the Carquinez Bridge in May 1927, the San Francisco–Oakland Bay Bridge in 1936, the Golden Gate Bridge in 1937, the Richmond–San Rafael Bridge in 1956, and the San Mateo–Hayward Bridge in 1967.

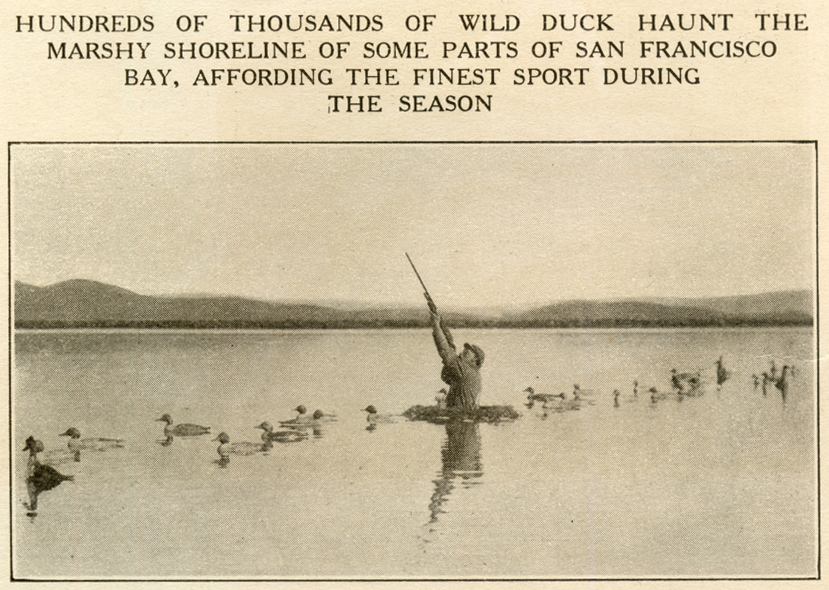
Duck hunting on the Bay, 1915

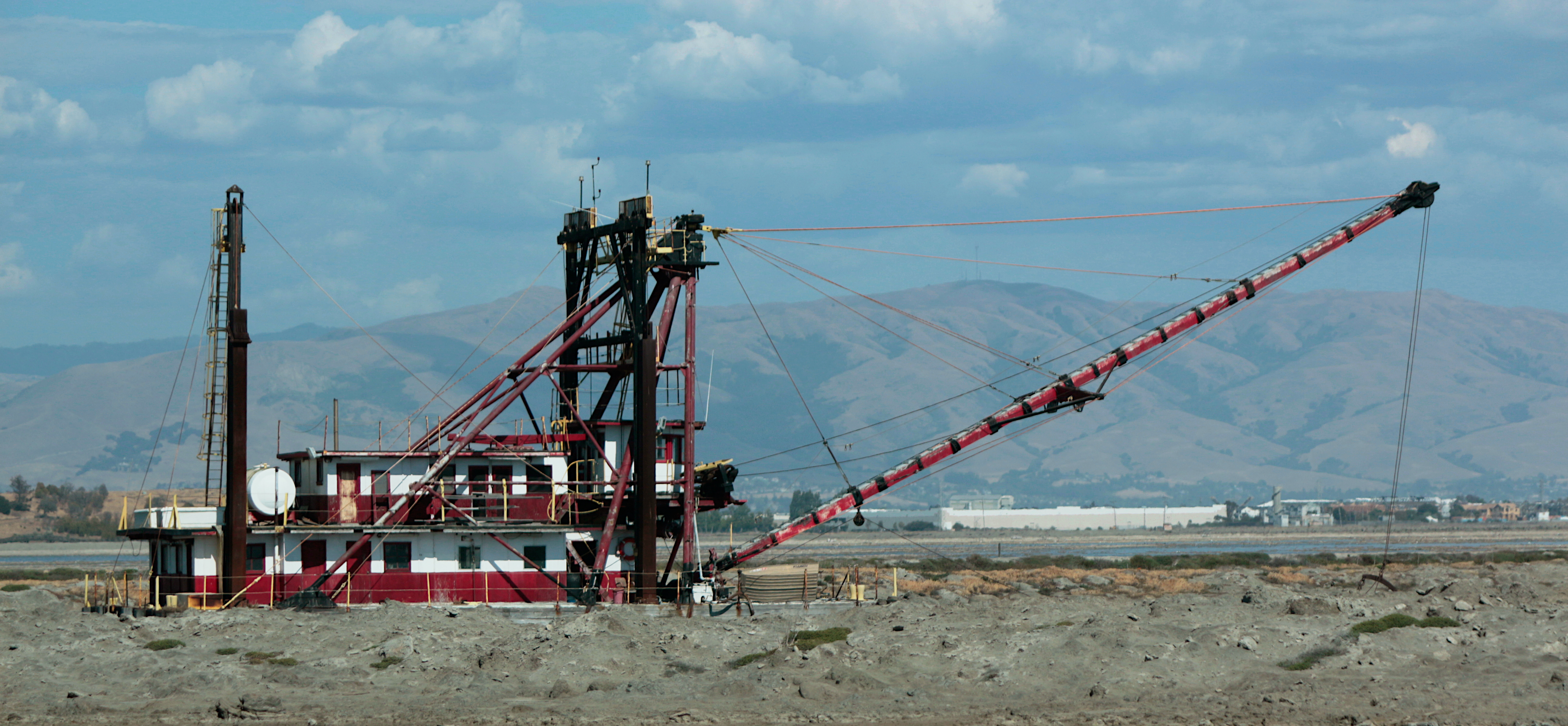
Mallard II, a clamshell dredge built in 1936 and used into the 21st century to dredge levees for Cargill's salt ponds in the bay

During the 20th century, the bay was subject to the 1940s Reber Plan, which would have filled in parts of the bay in order to increase industrial activity along the waterfront. In 1959, the United States Army Corps of Engineers released a report stating that if current infill trends continued, the bay would be as big as a shipping channel by 2020. This news led to the creation of the Save the Bay movement in 1960, which mobilized to stop the infill of wetlands as well as the bay itself, which had shrunk to two-thirds of its size in the century before 1961.

On September 17, 1965, the California State Legislature enacted the McAteer-Petris Act, which created the San Francisco Bay Conservation and Development Commission. Since then, the commission has strictly regulated bay fill. Foster City, Redwood Shores, Paradise Cay, and Emeryville's western expansion were among the last developments along the bay shoreline before McAteer-Petris limited additional filling of the bay.

San Francisco Bay continues to support some of the densest industrial production and urban settlement in the United States. The San Francisco Bay Area is the American West's second-largest urban area, with approximately seven million residents.

== Ecology ==
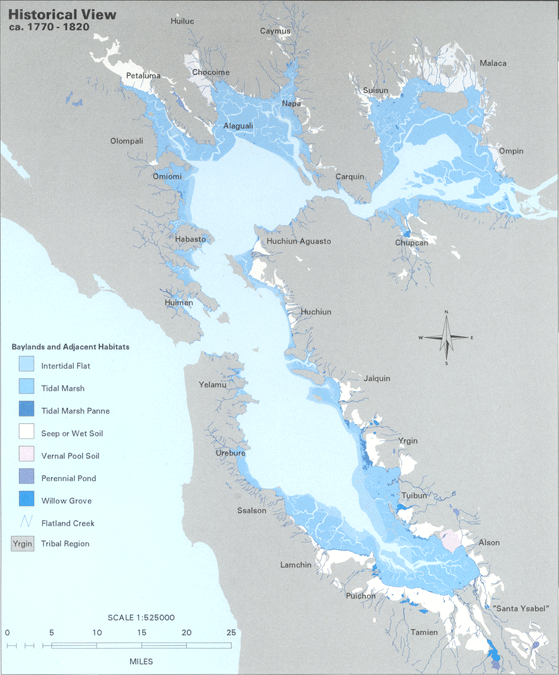
San Francisco Bay c. 1770–1820

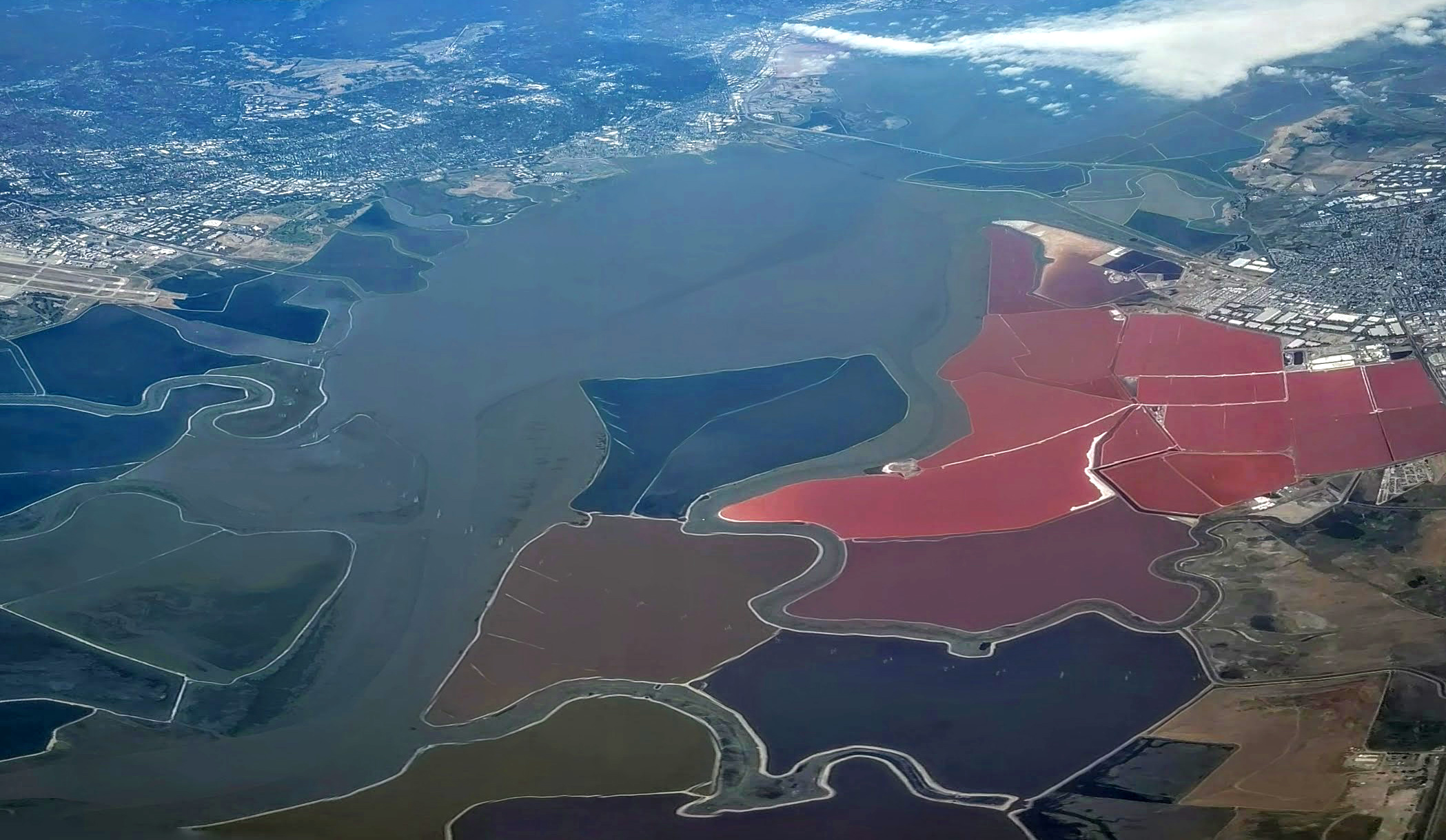
South Bay salt ponds and wildlife refuges, aerial view from the southeast

Despite its urban and industrial character, San Francisco Bay and the Sacramento–San Joaquin River Delta remain perhaps California's most important ecological habitats, including tidal marshes, mudflats, pannes, among others. California's Dungeness crab, California halibut, and Pacific salmon fisheries rely on the bay as a nursery. The few remaining salt marshes now represent most of California's remaining salt marsh, supporting a number of endangered species and providing key ecosystem services such as filtering pollutants and sediments from the rivers. San Francisco Bay is recognized for protection by the California Bays and Estuaries Policy, with oversight provided by the San Francisco Estuary Partnership.

Most famously, the bay is a key link in the Pacific Flyway. Millions of waterfowl annually use the bay shallows as a refuge. Two endangered species of birds are found here: the California least tern and the Ridgway's Rail. Exposed bay muds provide important feeding areas for shorebirds, but underlying layers of bay mud pose geological hazards for structures near many parts of the bay perimeter. San Francisco Bay provided the nation's first wildlife refuge, Oakland's artificial Lake Merritt, constructed in the 1860s, and America's first urban National Wildlife Refuge, the Don Edwards San Francisco Bay National Wildlife Refuge (SFBNWR) in 1972. The bay is also plagued by non-native species.

Salt produced from San Francisco Bay is produced in salt evaporation ponds and is shipped throughout the Western United States to bakeries, canneries, fisheries, cheese makers and other food industries and used to de-ice winter highways, clean kidney dialysis machines, for animal nutrition, and in many industries. Many companies have produced salt in the bay, with the Leslie Salt Company the largest private land owner in the Bay Area in the 1940s.

Low-salinity salt ponds mirror the ecosystem of the bay, with fish and fish-eating birds in abundance. Mid-salinity ponds support dense populations of brine shrimp, which provide a rich food source for millions of shorebirds. Only salt-tolerant micro-algae survive in the high salinity ponds, and impart a deep red color to these ponds from the pigment within the algae protoplasm. The salt marsh harvest mouse is an endangered species endemic to the wetlands of San Francisco Bay with a high salt tolerance. It needs native pickleweed, which is often displaced by invasive cordgrass, for its habitat.

The seasonal range of water temperature in the bay is from January's 53 °F (12 °C) to September's 60 °F (16 °C) when measured at Fort Point, which is near the southern end of the Golden Gate Bridge and at the entrance to San Francisco Bay.

For the first time in 65 years, Pacific Harbor Porpoise (Phocoena phocoena) returned to the bay in 2009. Golden Gate Cetacean Research, a non-profit organization focused on research on cetaceans, has developed a photo-identification database enabling the scientists to identify specific porpoise individuals and is trying to ascertain whether a healthier bay has brought their return. Pacific harbor porpoise range from Point Conception, California, to Alaska and across to the Kamchatka Peninsula and Japan. Recent genetic studies show that there is a local stock from San Francisco to the Russian River and that eastern Pacific coastal populations rarely migrate far, unlike western Atlantic Harbor porpoise.

The common bottlenose dolphin (Tursiops truncatus) has been extending its current range northwards from the Southern California Bight. The first coastal bottlenose dolphin in the Bay Area in recent times was spotted in 1983 off the San Mateo County coast in 1983. In 2001, bottlenose dolphins were first spotted east of the Golden Gate Bridge and confirmed by photographic evidence in 2007. Zooarcheological remains of bottlenose dolphins indicated that bottlenose dolphins inhabited San Francisco Bay in prehistoric times until at least 700 years before present, and dolphin skulls dredged from the bay suggest occasional visitors in historic times.

== Pollution ==
San Francisco Bay faces many of the same water quality issues as other urban waterways in industrialized countries, or downstream of intensive agriculture. According to state water quality regulators, San Francisco Bay waters do not meet water quality standards for the following pollutants:

- DDT
- Mercury
- Selenium
- Polychlorinated biphenyls (PCBs)
- Dioxin compounds
- Furan compounds
- Trash
- Diazinon
- Chlordane
- Dieldrin

=== Mercury ===
Industrial, mining, and other uses of mercury have resulted in a widespread distribution in the bay, with uptake in the bay's phytoplankton and contamination of its sportfish.

=== Oil spills ===
In January 1971, two Standard Oil tankers collided in the bay, creating an 800,000-U.S.-gallon (3,000,000-liter) oil spill disaster, which spurred environmental protection of the bay. In November 2007, a ship named COSCO Busan collided with the San Francisco–Oakland Bay Bridge and spilled over 58,000 U.S. gallons (220,000 liters) of bunker fuel, creating the largest oil spill in the region since 1996.

=== Nutrients ===
The bay also has some of the highest levels of dissolved inorganic nitrogen known from any coastal water body, mostly originating from treated wastewater from publicly owned treatment works. In other bays, such nutrient levels would likely lead to eutrophication, but historically, the bay has had less harmful algal blooms than other water bodies with similar nutrient concentrations. Potential explanations have included the presence of intensive "top-down control" from grazing clams like Potamocorbula, high sediment supply limiting light availability for the algae, and intensive tidal mixing. The occurrence of an unprecedented harmful algal bloom of Heterosigma akashiwo in 2022, resulting in mass fish deaths and anoxia, suggests that the mechanisms of control on algal growth may be eroding.

=== PBDEs ===
The bay was once considered a hotspot for polybrominated diphenyl ether (PBDE) flame retardants used to make upholstered furniture and infant care items less flammable. PBDEs have been largely phased out and replaced with alternative phosphate flame retardants. A 2019 San Francisco Estuary Institute (SFEI) study assayed a wide range of these newer flame retardant chemicals in Bay waters, bivalve California mussels (Mytilus californianus), and harbor seals (Phoca vitulina) which haul out in Corkscrew Slough on Bair Island in San Mateo County, with phosphate flame retardant contaminants such as tris(1,3-dichloro-2-propyl)phosphate (TDCPP) and triphenyl phosphate (TPhP) found at levels comparable to thresholds for aquatic toxicity.

=== Emerging contaminants ===
Thousands of man-made chemicals are found in Bay water, sediment, and organisms. For many of these, there is little or no data on their impacts on the environment or human health, and they are not regulated by state or federal law. These are often referred to as "contaminants of emerging concern." The San Francisco Estuary Institute has studied these chemicals in the Bay since 2001. Scientists have identified the following most likely to have a negative impact on Bay wildlife:

- PFOS
- fipronil
- nonylphenols
- nonylphenol ethoxylates
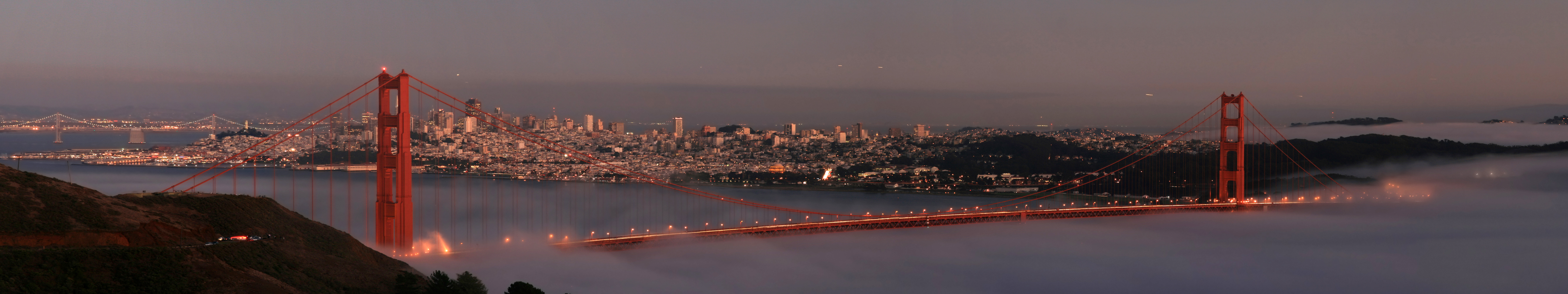
City skyline through the fog, from the Golden Gate National Recreation Area

== Bay fill and depth profile ==
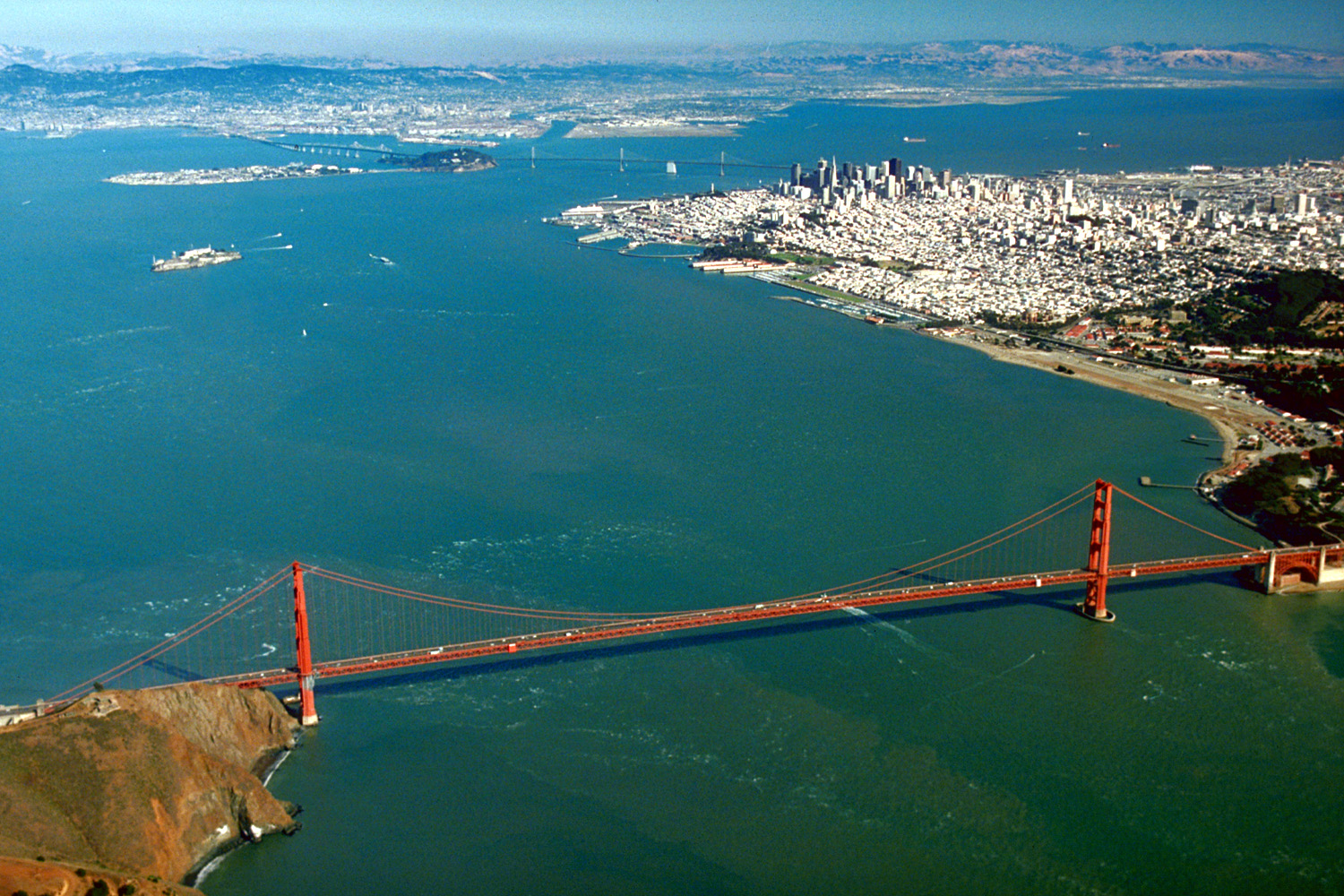
San Francisco Bay and the Golden Gate Bridge, looking southeast towards the City and East Bay. Alcatraz is the small islet in the upper-middle left.

San Francisco Bay's profile changed dramatically in the late 19th century and again with the initiation of dredging by the US Army Corps of Engineers in the 20th century. Before about 1860, most bay shores (with the exception of rocky shores, such as those in Carquinez Strait; along Marin shoreline; Point Richmond; Golden Gate area) contained extensive wetlands that graded nearly invisibly from freshwater wetlands to salt marsh and then tidal mudflat. A deep channel ran through the center of the bay, following the ancient drowned river valley.

In the 1860s and continuing into the early 20th century, miners dumped staggering quantities of mud and gravel from hydraulic mining operations into the upper Sacramento and San Joaquin Rivers. GK Gilbert's estimates of debris total more than eight times the amount of rock and dirt moved during construction of the Panama Canal. This material flowed down the rivers, progressively eroding into finer and finer sediment, until it reached the bay system. Here some of it settled, eventually filling in Suisun Bay, San Pablo Bay, and San Francisco Bay, in decreasing order of severity.

By the end of the 19th century, these "slickens" had filled in much of the shallow bay flats, raising the entire bay profile. New marshes were created in some areas.

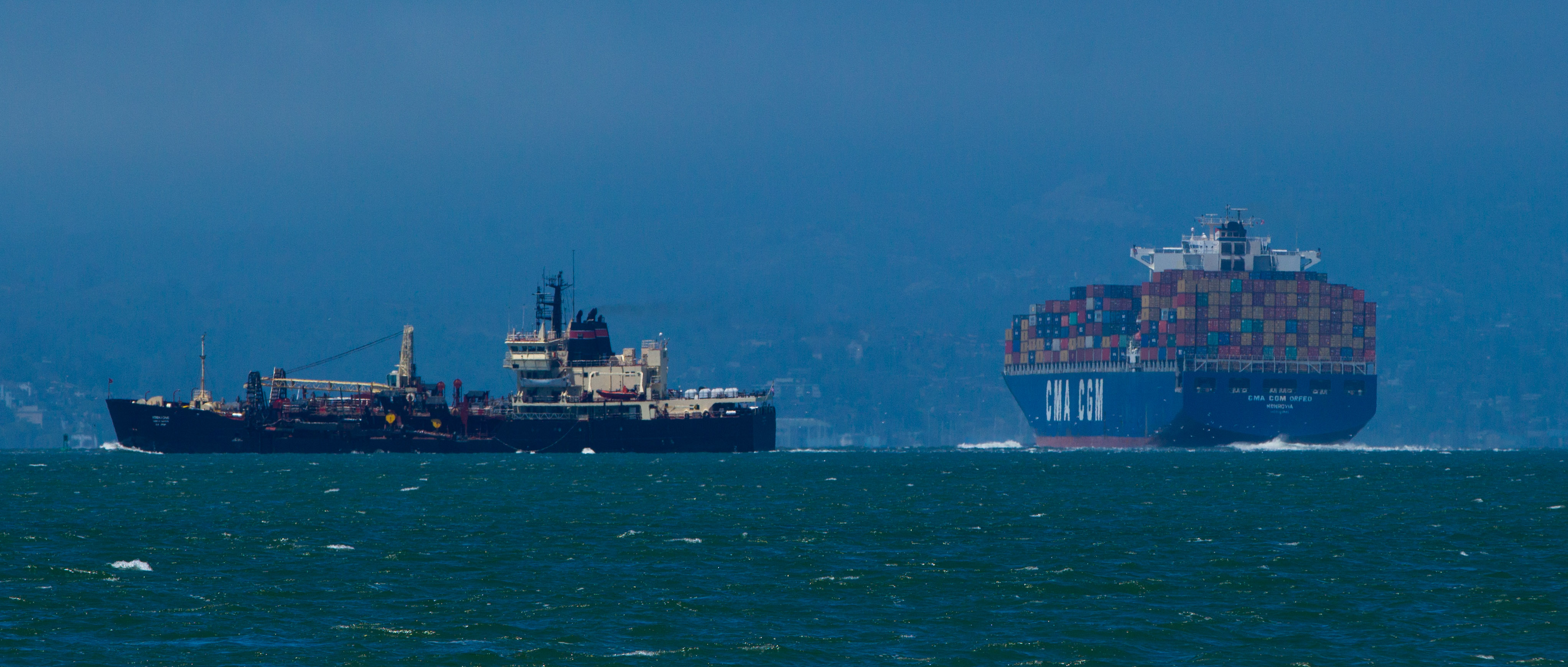
Cargo ships in San Francisco Bay in 2012

In the decades surrounding 1900, at the behest of local political officials and following Congressional orders, the U.S. Army Corps began dredging the Sacramento and San Joaquin Rivers and the deep channels of San Francisco Bay. This work has continued without interruption ever since. Some of the dredge spoils were initially dumped in the bay shallows (including helping to create Treasure Island on the former shoals to the north of Yerba Buena Island) and used to raise islands in the Sacramento-San Joaquin Delta. The net effect of dredging has been to maintain a narrow deep channel—deeper perhaps than the original bay channel—through a much shallower bay. At the same time, most of the marsh areas have been filled or blocked off from the bay by dikes.

Large ships transiting the bay must follow deep underwater channels that are maintained by frequent dredging as the average depth of the bay is only as deep as a swimming pool—approximately 12 to 15 ft (4–5 m). Between Hayward and San Mateo to San Jose it is 12 to 36 in (30–90 cm). The deepest part of the bay is under and out of the Golden Gate Bridge, at 372 ft (113 m).

In the late 1990s, a 12-year harbor-deepening project for the Port of Oakland began; it was largely completed by September 2009. Previously, the bay waters and harbor facilities only allowed for ships with a draft of 46 ft (14 m), but dredging activities undertaken by the United States Army Corps of Engineers in partnership with the Port of Oakland succeeded in providing access for vessels with a 50-foot (15 m) draft. Four dredging companies were employed in the US$432 million project, with $244 million paid for with federal funds and $188 million supplied by the Port of Oakland. Some six million cubic yards (160 million cubic feet; 4.6 million cubic meters) of mud from the dredging was deposited at the western edge of Middle Harbor Shoreline Park to become a 188-acre (0.294 mi^{2}; 0.76 km^{2}) shallow-water wetlands habitat for marine and shore life. Further dredging followed in 2011, to maintain the navigation channel. This dredging enabled the arrival of the largest container ship ever to enter San Francisco Bay, the MSC Fabiola. Bay pilots trained for the visit on a simulator at the California Maritime Academy for over a year. The ship arrived drawing less than its full draft of 50 feet 10 inches (15.5 m) because it held only three-quarters of a load after its stop in Long Beach.

== Transportation ==
1. / Richmond–San Rafael Bridge; 2. / Golden Gate Bridge; 3. / San Francisco–Oakland Bay Bridge; 4. / San Mateo–Hayward Bridge; 5. / Dumbarton Bridge; 6. / Carquinez Bridge; 7. / Benicia–Martinez Bridge; 8. / Antioch Bridge

San Francisco Bay was traversed by watercraft before the arrival of Europeans. Indigenous peoples used canoes to fish and clam along the shoreline. Sailing ships enabled transportation between the bay and other parts of the world—and served as ferries and freighters within the bay and between the bay and inland ports, such as Sacramento and Stockton. These were gradually replaced by steam-powered vessels starting in the late 19th century. Several shipyards were established around the bay, augmented during wartime (e.g., the Kaiser Shipyards, Richmond Shipyards) near Richmond in 1940 for World War II for construction of mass-produced, assembly line Liberty and Victory cargo ships.

San Francisco Bay is spanned by nine bridges, eight of which carry cars.

- The Richmond–San Rafael Bridge on Interstate 580 (I-580) connects Marin and Contra Costa counties.
- The Golden Gate Bridge on U.S. Route 101/State Route 1 (US 101/SR 1) was the largest single span suspension bridge ever built at the time of its 1937 construction. It spans the Golden Gate, the strait between San Francisco and Marin County, and is the only bridge in the area not owned by the State of California.
- The San Francisco–Oakland Bay Bridge on I-80 connects Alameda and San Francisco counties.
- The San Mateo–Hayward Bridge on SR 92 connects Alameda and San Mateo counties.
- The Dumbarton Bridge on SR 84 connects Alameda and San Mateo counties.
- The Carquinez Bridge (including the Alfred Zampa Memorial Bridge) on I-80 connects Contra Costa and Solano counties.
- The Benicia Bridge on I-680 also connects Contra Costa and Solano counties.
- The Antioch Bridge on SR 160 connects Contra Costa and Sacramento counties.
- The Dumbarton Rail Bridge is an abandoned bridge that used to carry rail traffic.

The Transbay Tube, an underwater rail tunnel, carries BART services between Oakland and San Francisco.

Prior to the bridges and, later, the Transbay Tube, transbay transportation was dominated by fleets of ferryboats operated by the Southern Pacific Railroad and the Key System transit company. However, in recent decades, ferries have returned, primarily serving commuters from Marin County, relieving the traffic bottleneck of the Golden Gate Bridge (see Ferries of San Francisco Bay).

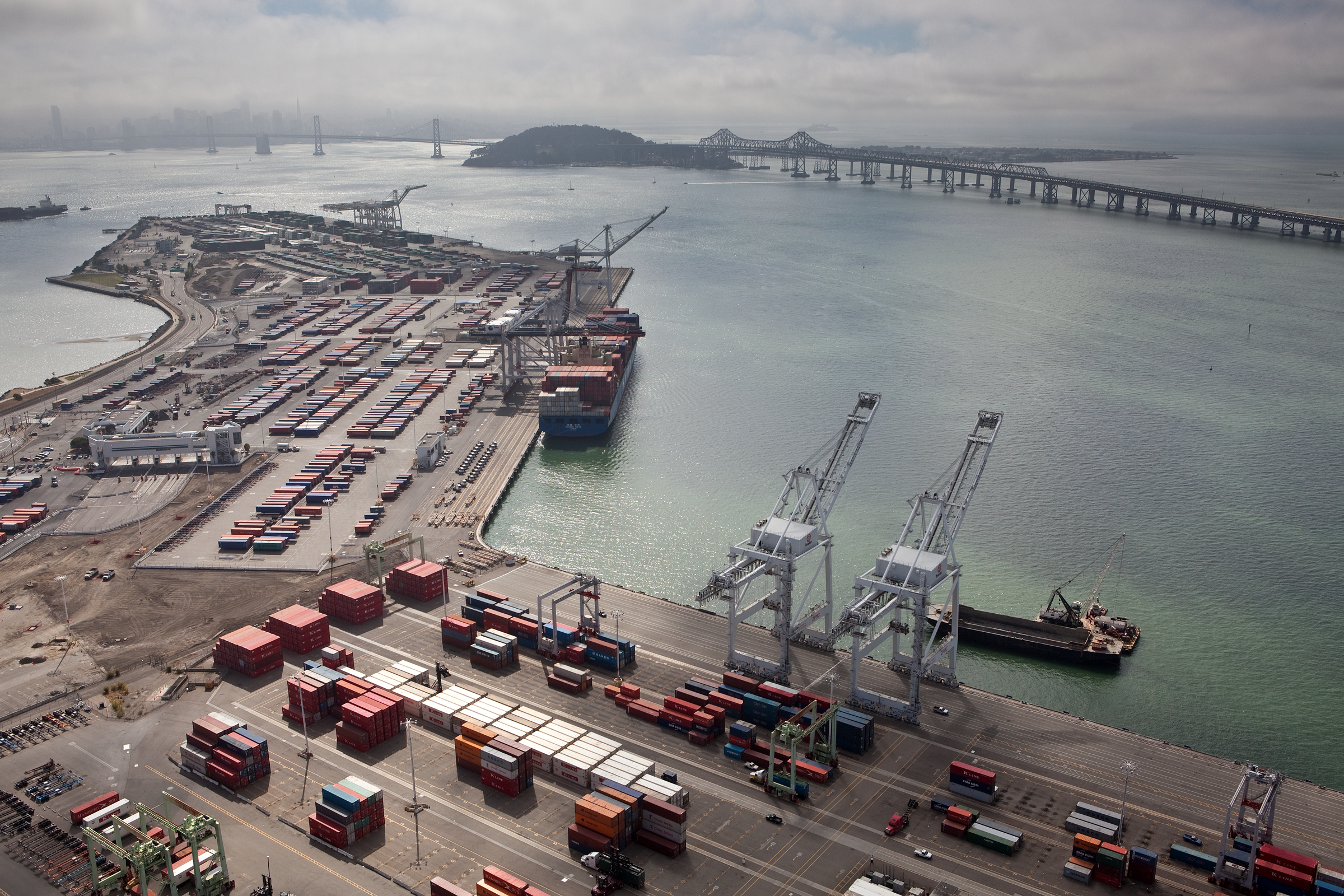
Port of Oakland, California

The bay also continues to serve as a major seaport. The Port of Oakland is one of the largest cargo ports in the United States, while the Port of Richmond and the Port of San Francisco provide smaller services.

An additional crossing south of the Bay Bridge has long been proposed.

== Recreation ==
San Francisco Bay is popular for sailors (boats, as well as windsurfing and kitesurfing), due to consistent strong westerly/northwesterly thermally-generated winds – Beaufort force 6 (15–25 knots; 17–29 mph; 8–13 m/s) is common on summer afternoons – and protection from large open ocean swells. Yachting and yacht racing are popular pastimes and the San Francisco Bay Area is home to many of the world's top sailors. A shoreline bicycle and pedestrian trail known as the San Francisco Bay Trail encircles the edge of the bay. The San Francisco Bay Area Water Trail, a growing network of launching and landing sites around the bay for non-motorized small boat users (such as kayakers) is being developed. Parks and protected areas around the bay include Eden Landing Ecological Reserve, Hayward Regional Shoreline, Don Edwards San Francisco Bay National Wildlife Refuge, Hayward Shoreline Interpretive Center, Crown Memorial State Beach, Eastshore State Park, Point Isabel Regional Shoreline, Brooks Island Regional Preserve, and César Chávez Park.

The California Office of Environmental Health Hazard Assessment (OEHHA) has developed a safe eating advisory for fish caught in San Francisco Bay based on levels of mercury or PCBs found in local species.

The San Francisco Bay Area Water Trail is a planned system of designated trailheads designed to improve non-motorized small boat access to the bay. The California Coastal Conservancy approved funding in March 2011 to begin implementation of the water trail.

San Francisco Bay panorama with a view of sailboats, kite boarders, and the Crissy Field Beach

== Gallery ==
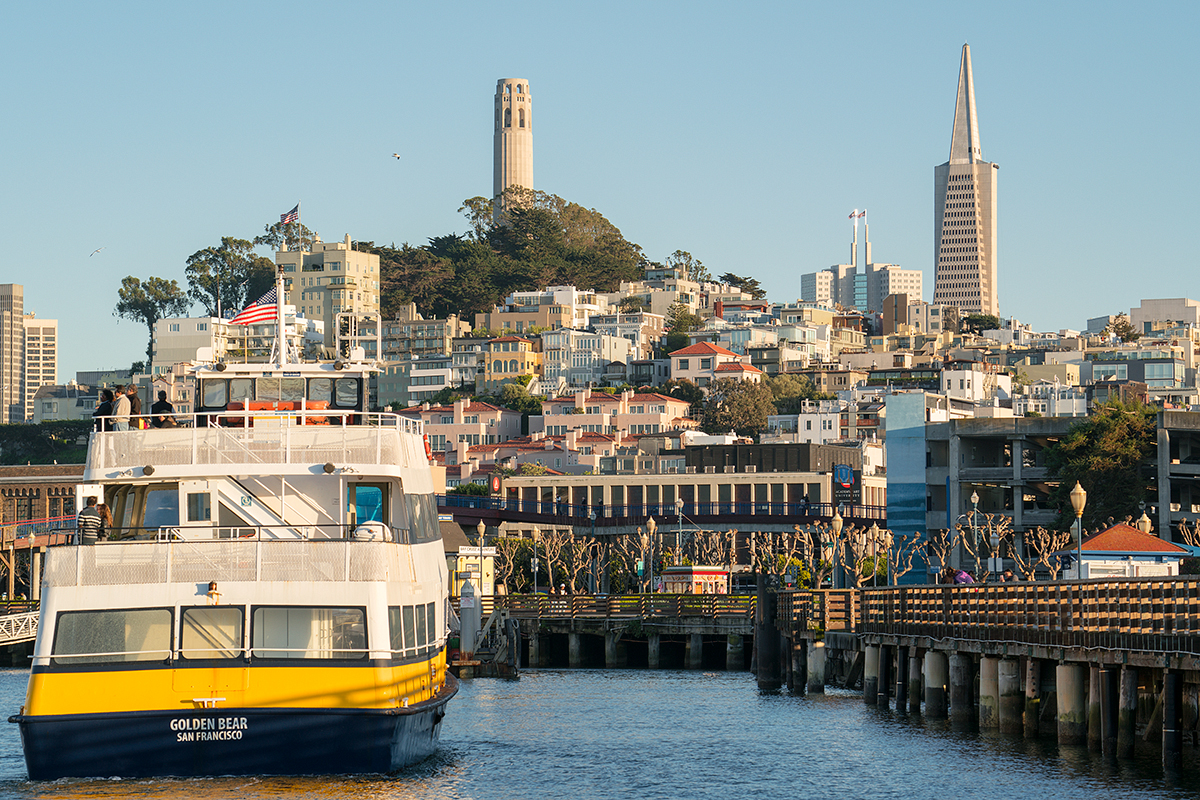
San Francisco from Forbes Island, Pier 39

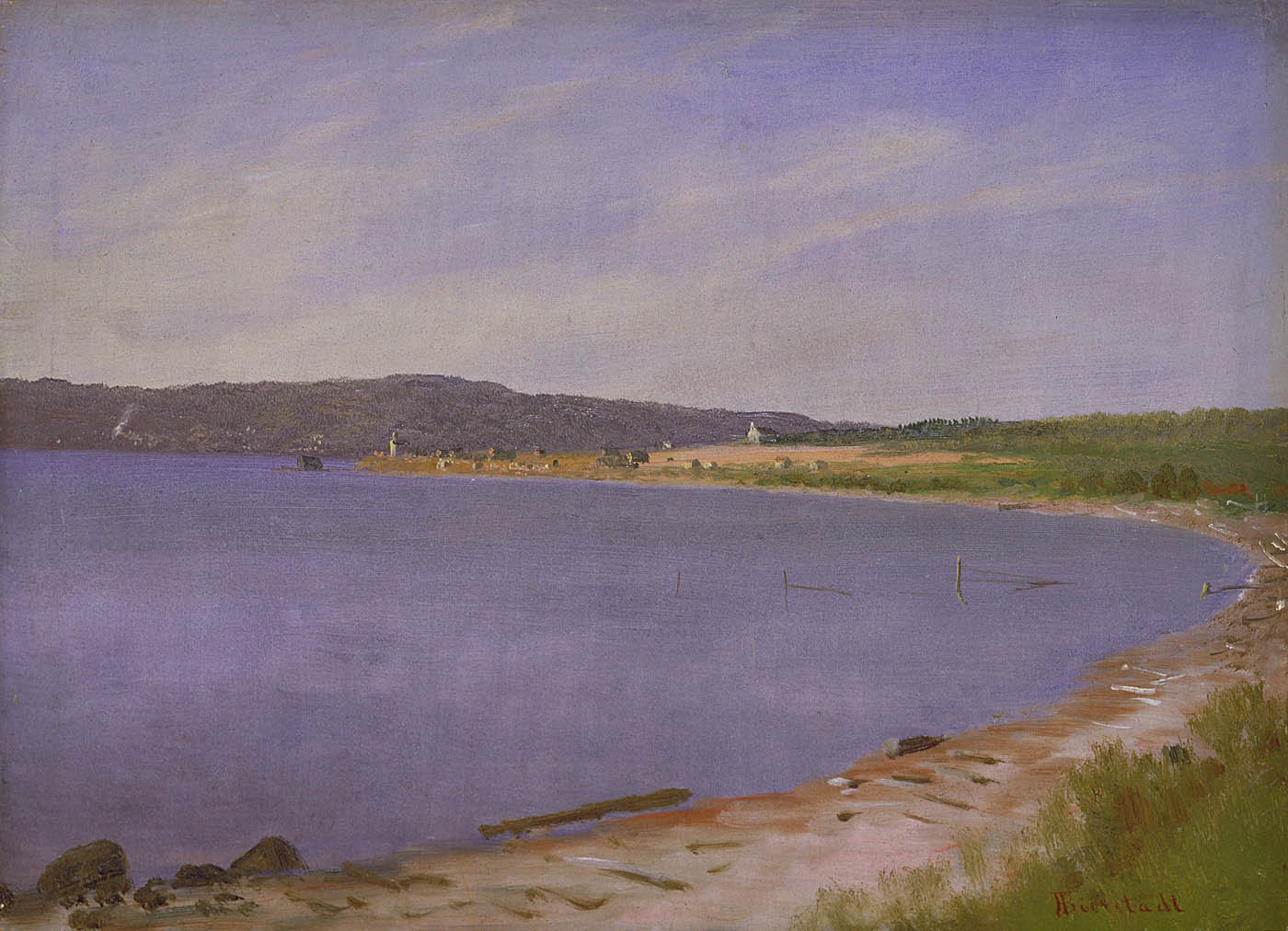
"San Francisco Bay", painting by Albert Bierstadt, 1871–73

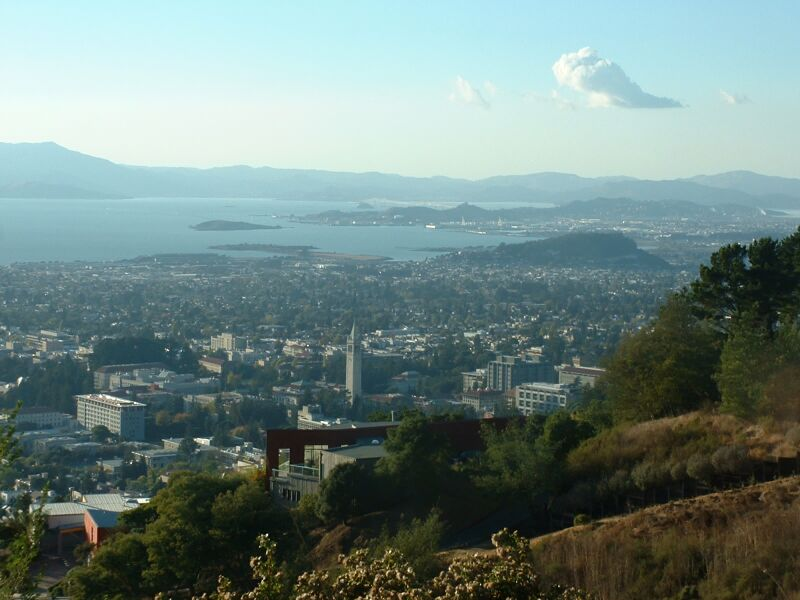
The City of Berkeley, San Francisco Bay, and Marin County in the background as seen from the Claremont Canyon reserve

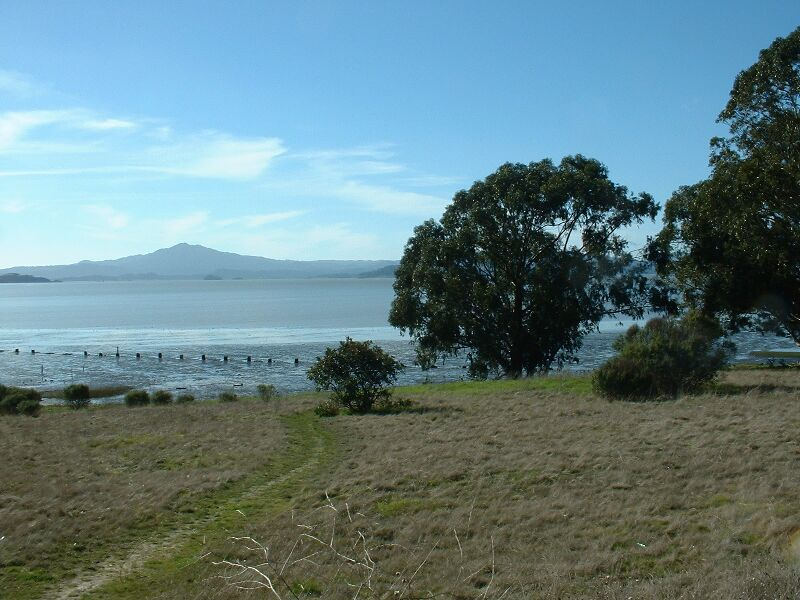
Mount Tamalpais view across San Pablo Bay at Point Pinole Regional Shoreline in Richmond

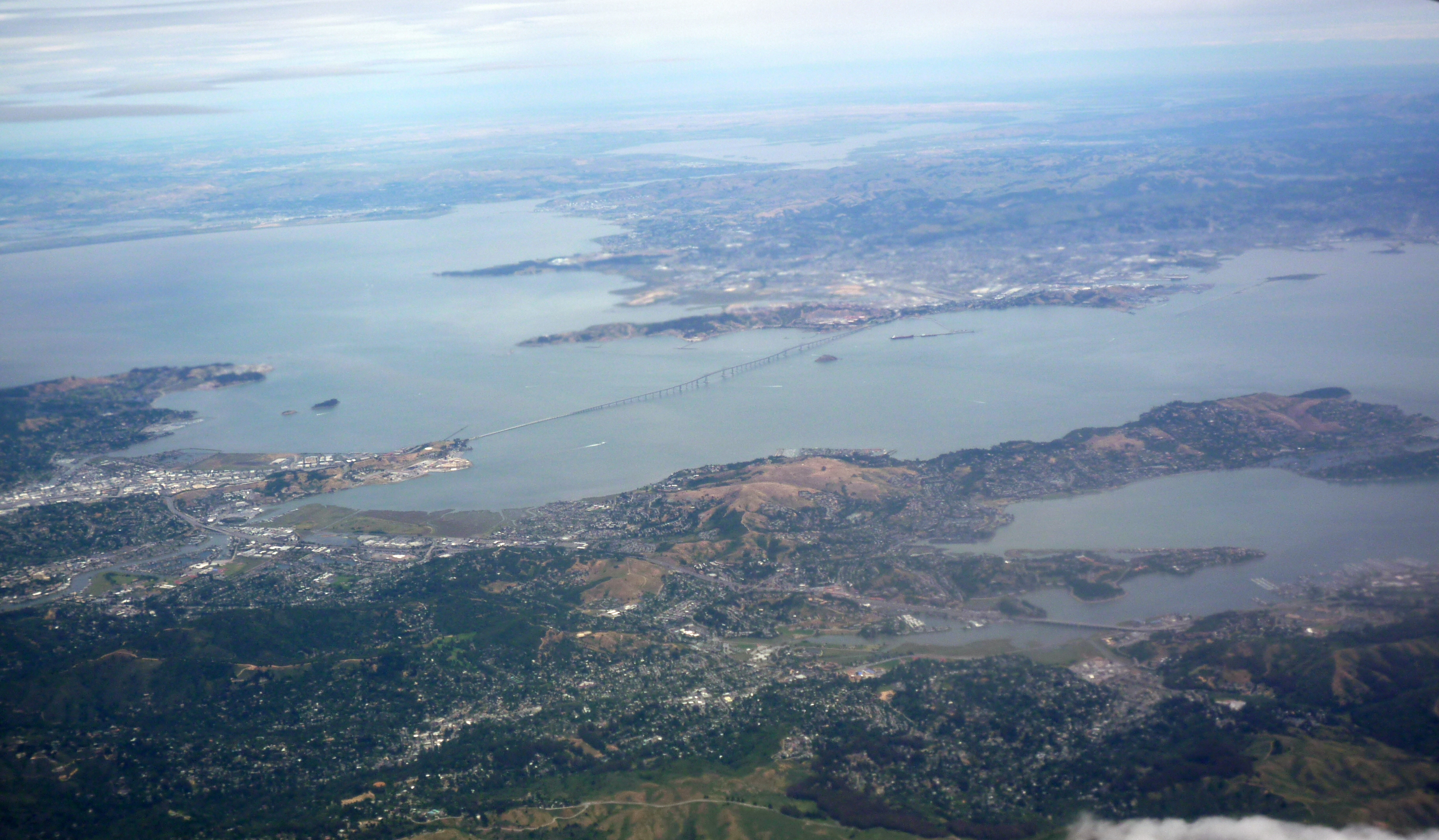
Looking north into San Pablo Bay at the Richmond–San Rafael Bridge, 2010

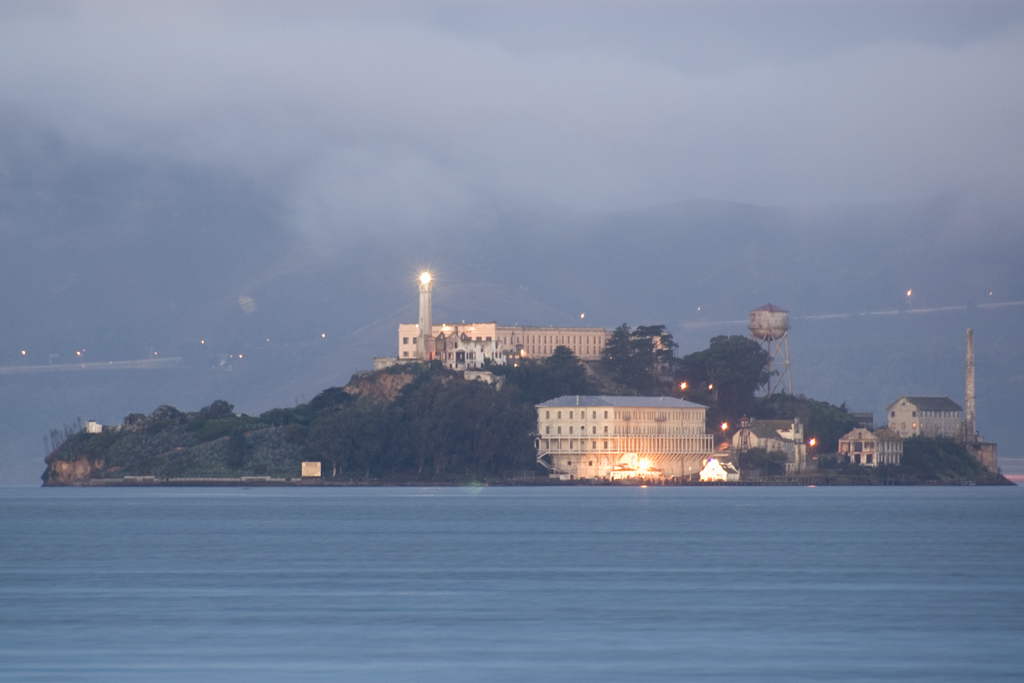
Alcatraz at dawn on San Francisco Bay

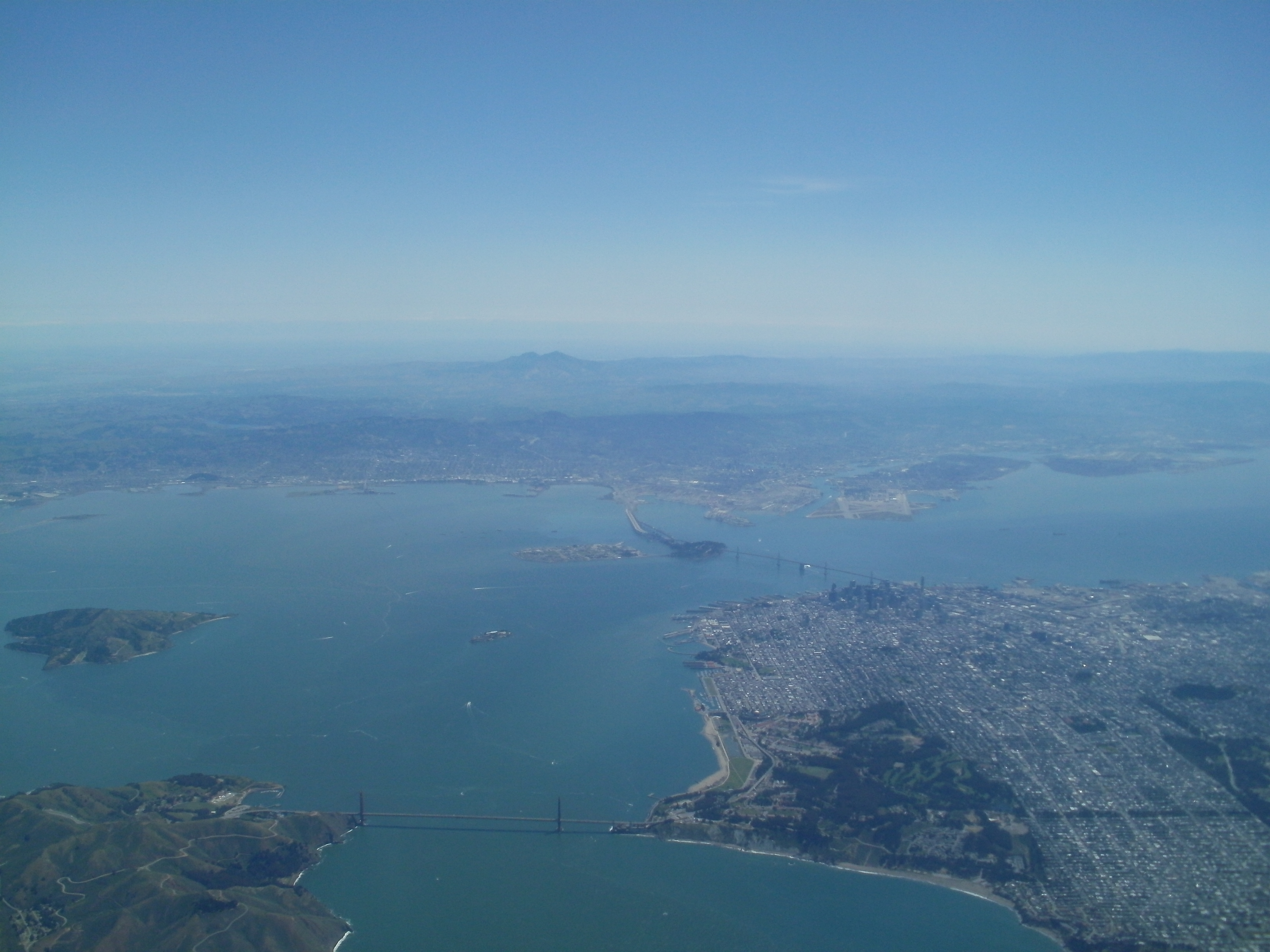
Aerial view of Golden Gate and the northern Bay, looking east from the Pacific

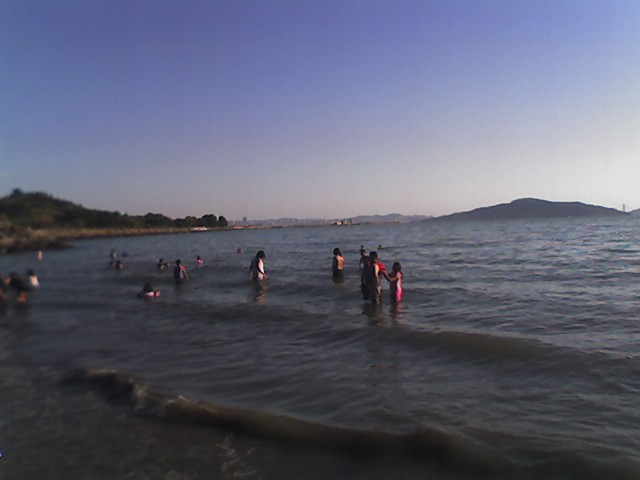
People also swim recreationally, at Kellar Beach in Richmond's Miller/Knox Regional Shoreline.

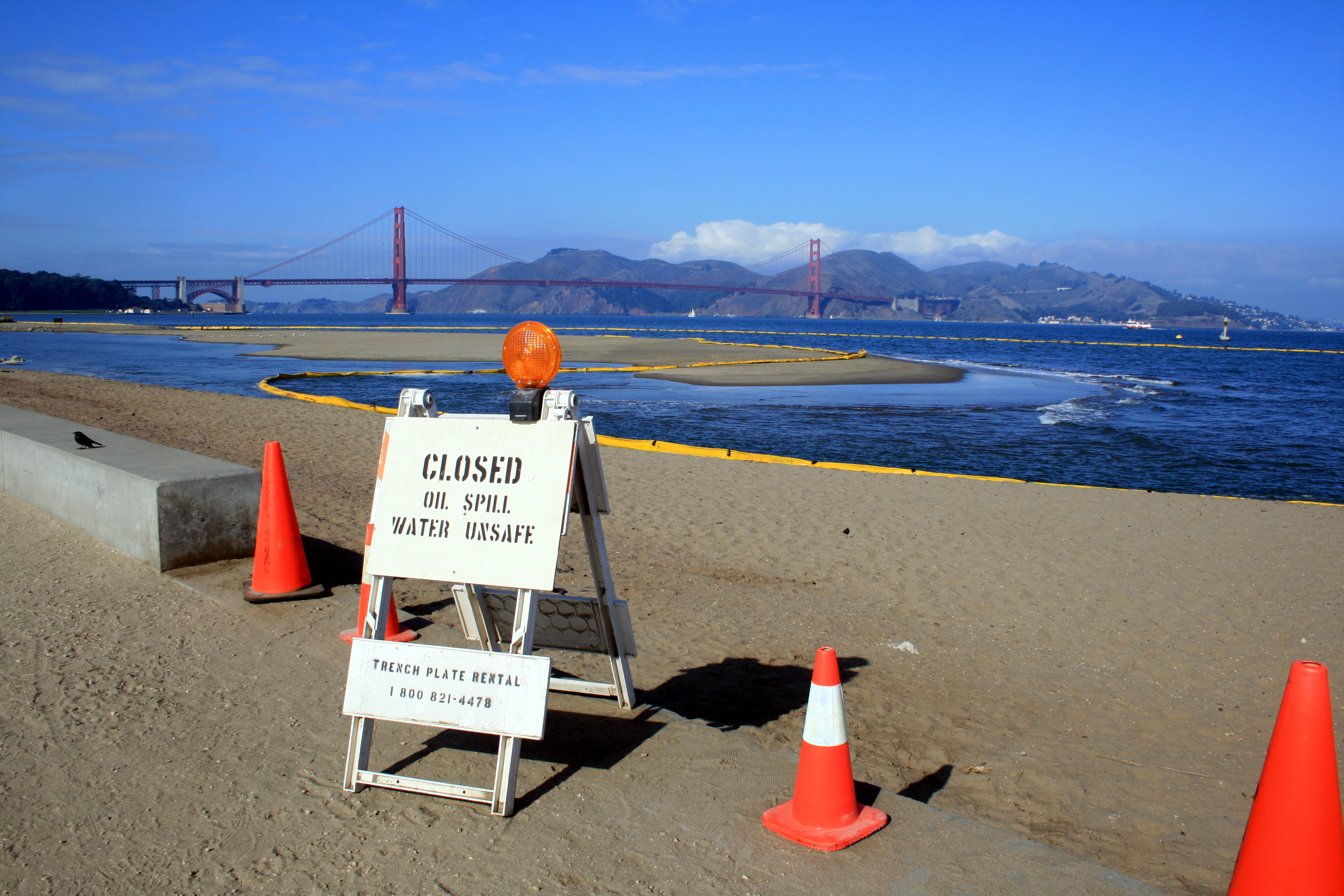
Oil Spill in the bay

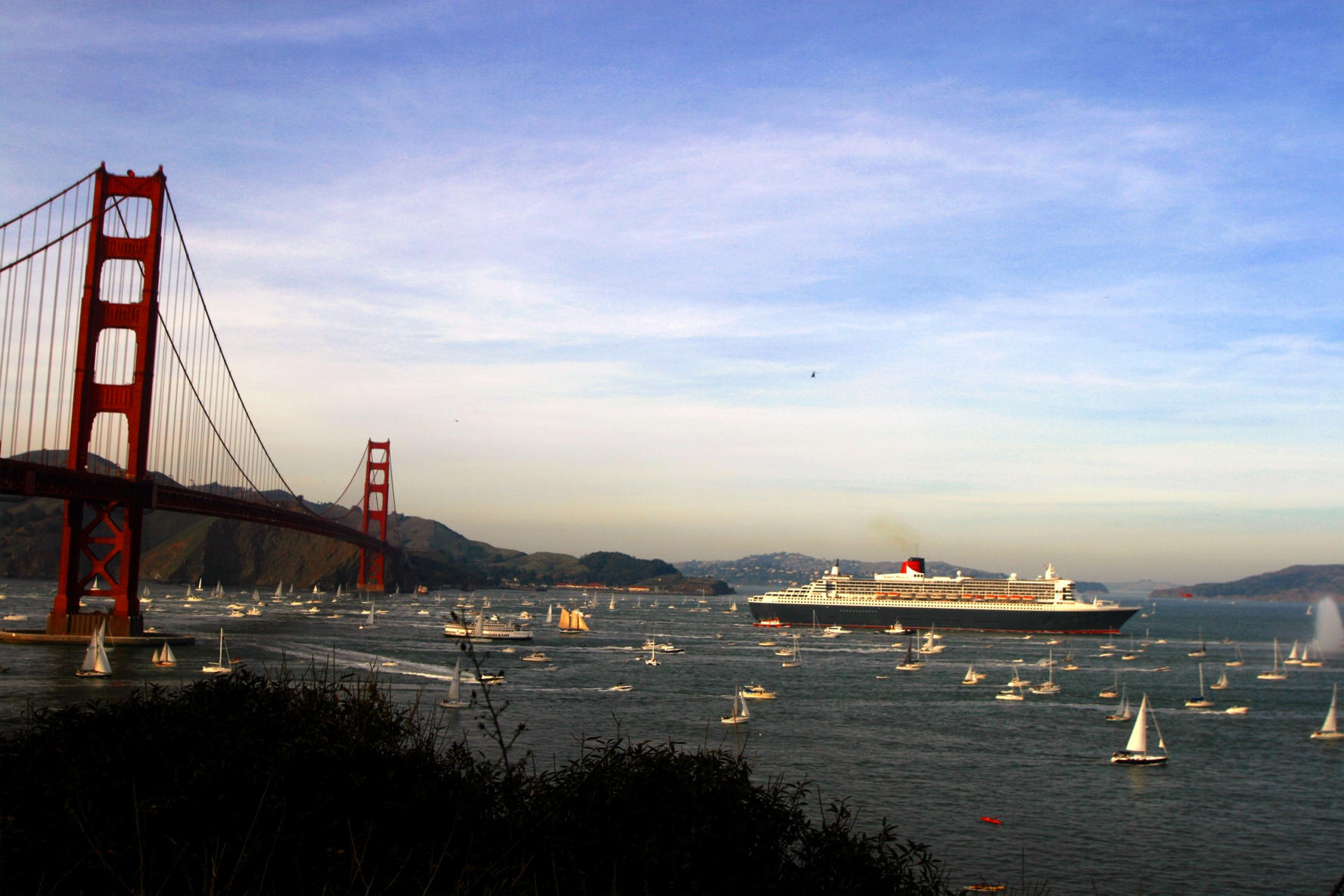
RMS Queen Mary 2 in San Francisco Bay

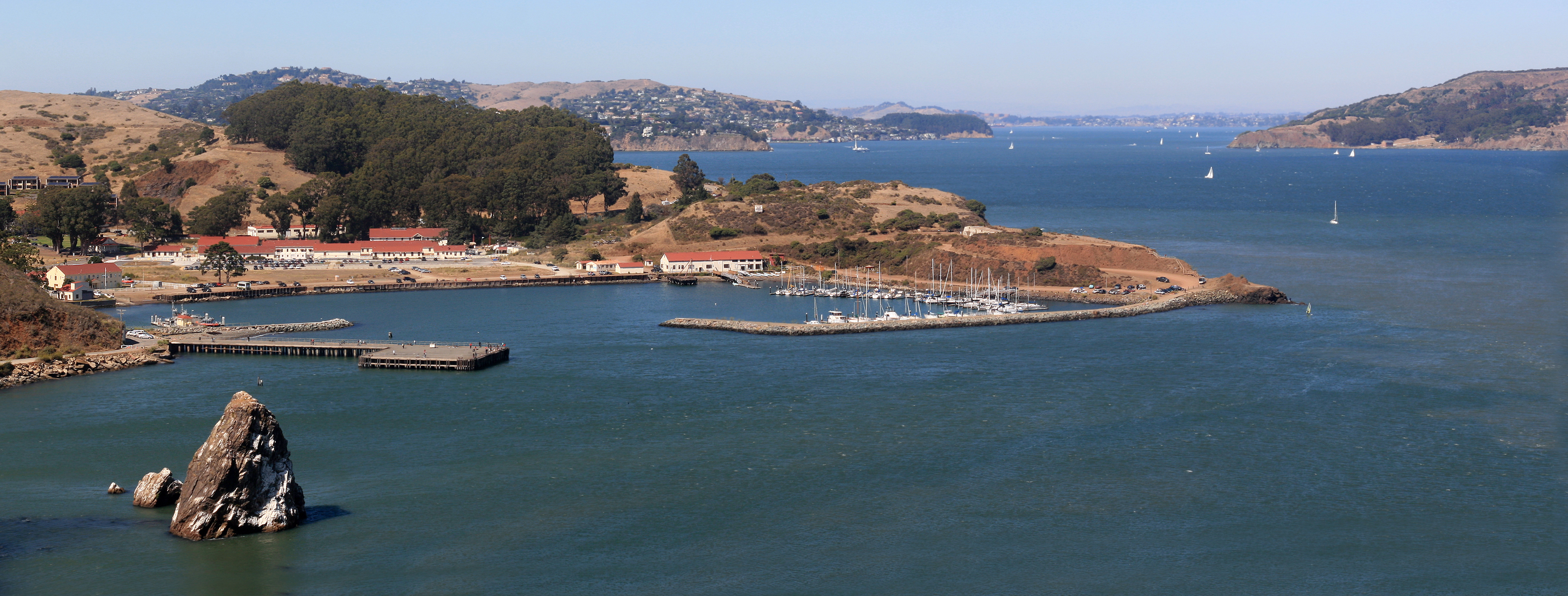
Fort Baker on San Francisco Bay, just east of the Golden Gate

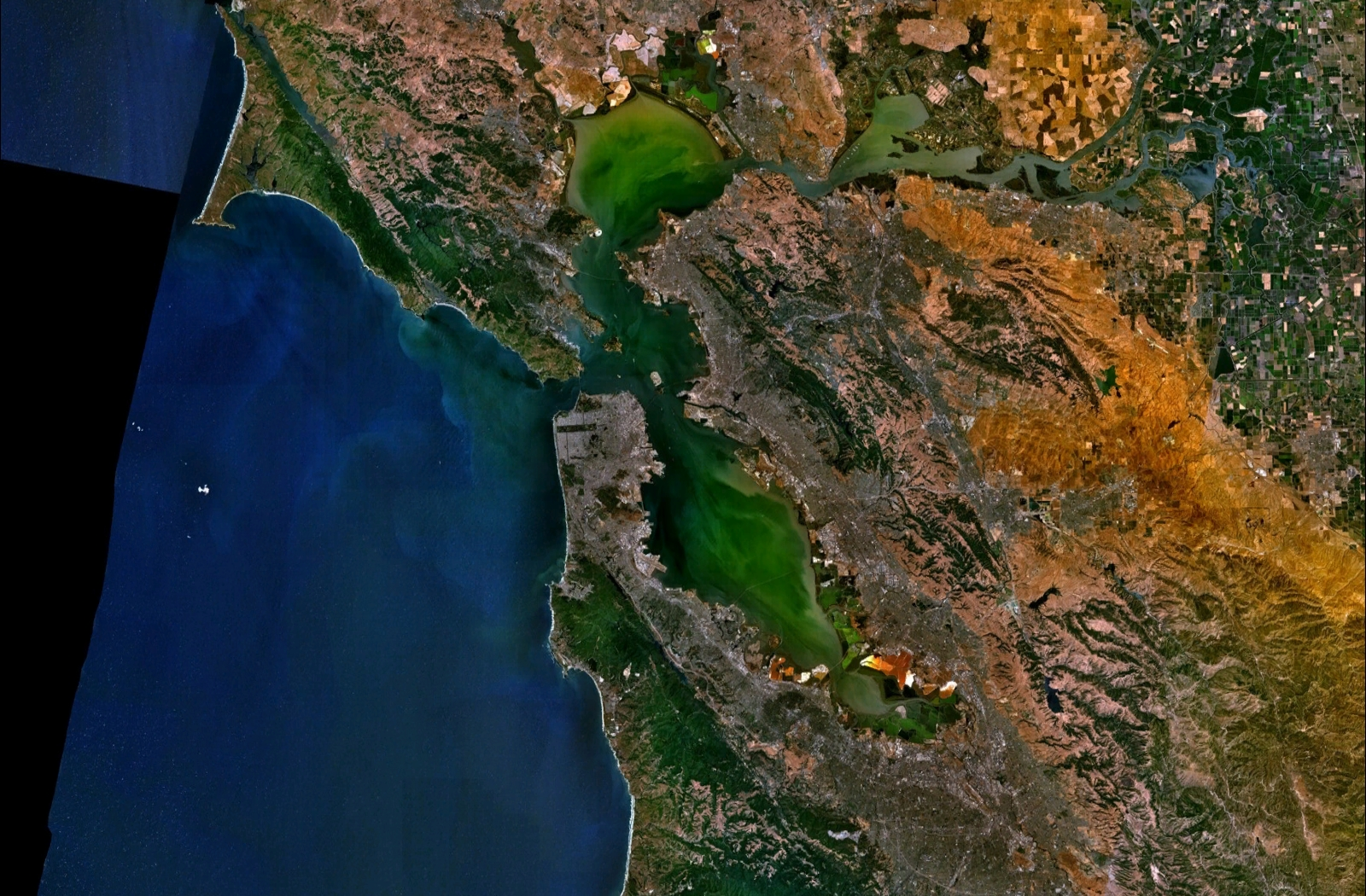
NASA satellite image, showing water flow

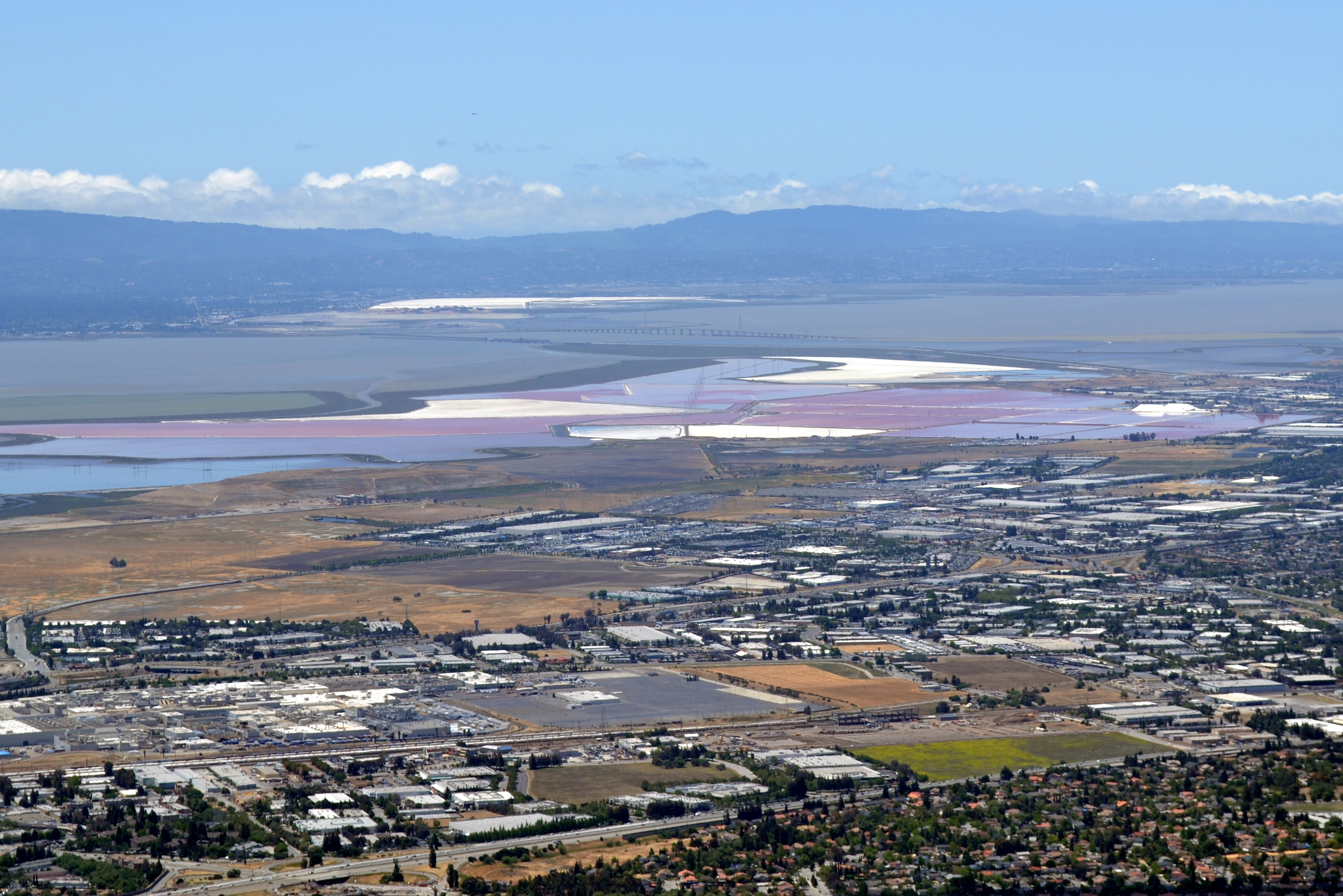
Salt ponds at the southern tip of the bay

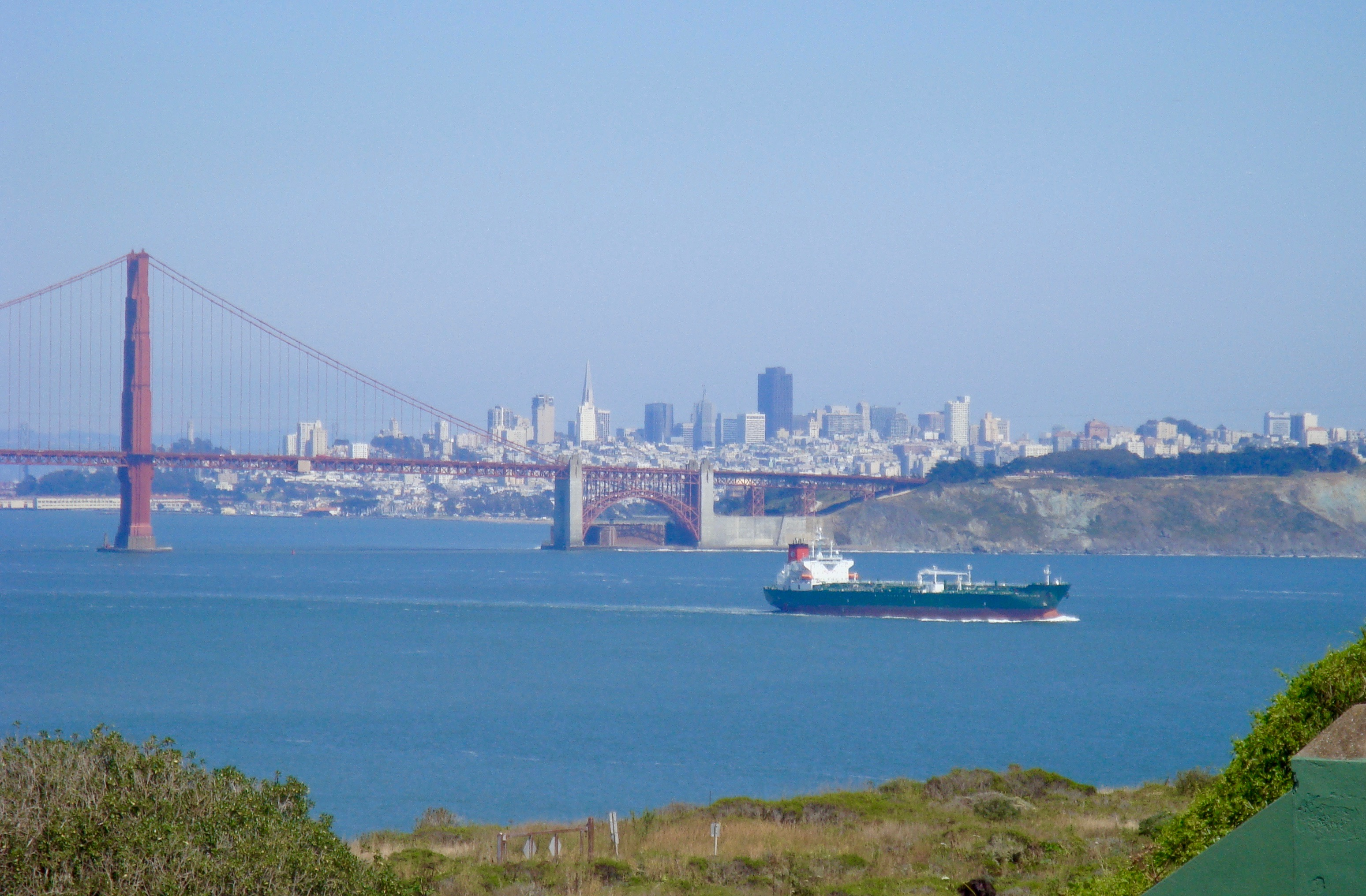
The bay seen in July 2010

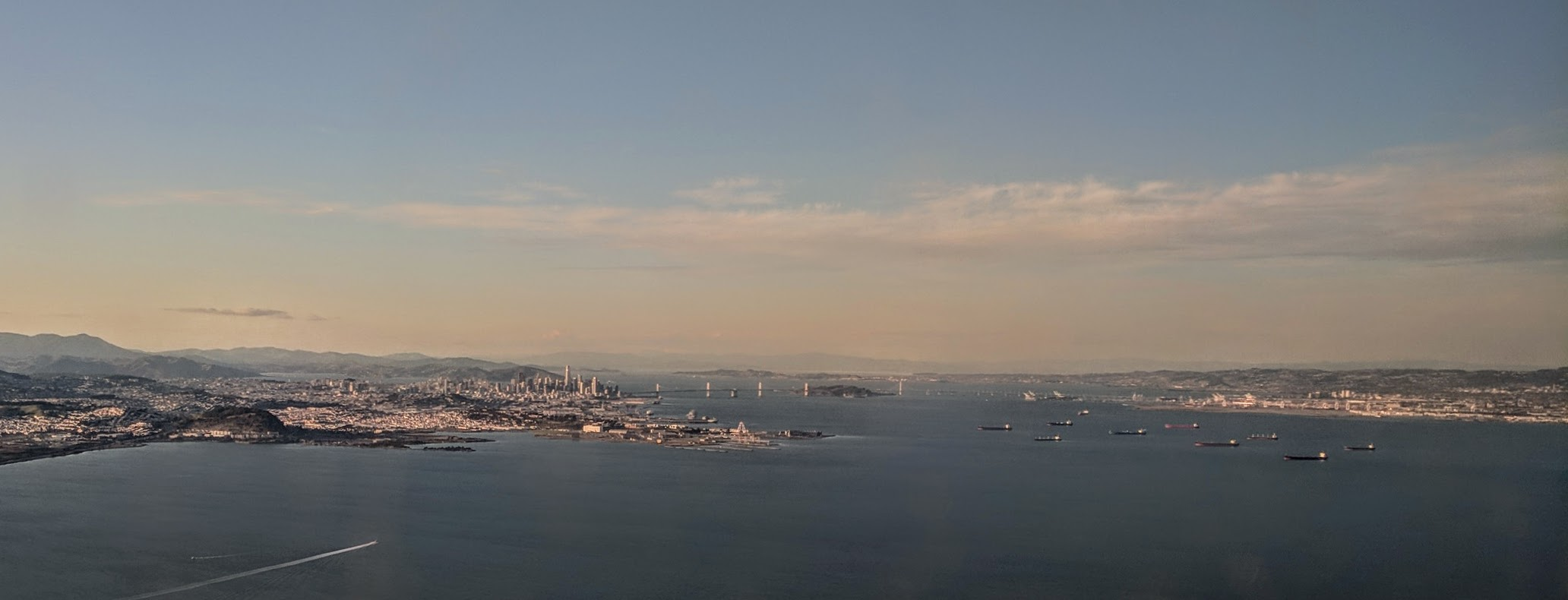
Ships at anchor in the bay

== See also ==
- Golden Gate
- Golden Gate Bridge
- Hydrography of the San Francisco Bay Area
- Islands of San Francisco Bay
- J.C. Barthel, who prepared "plans for the docks and other water-front improvements in the San Francisco Bay district"
- McLaughlin Eastshore State Park
- Mount Diablo
- Mount Tamalpais State Park
- Napa Sonoma Marsh
- Point Pinole Regional Shoreline, Richmond

== Literature ==
- The Bay of San Francisco: The metropolis of the Pacific Coast and its suburban cities: A history. Volume I. Lewis Publishing Company, Chicago, Ill. Published 1892. Contains index to biographical sketches
- Volume II – Biographies
