= California Division of Boating and Waterways =

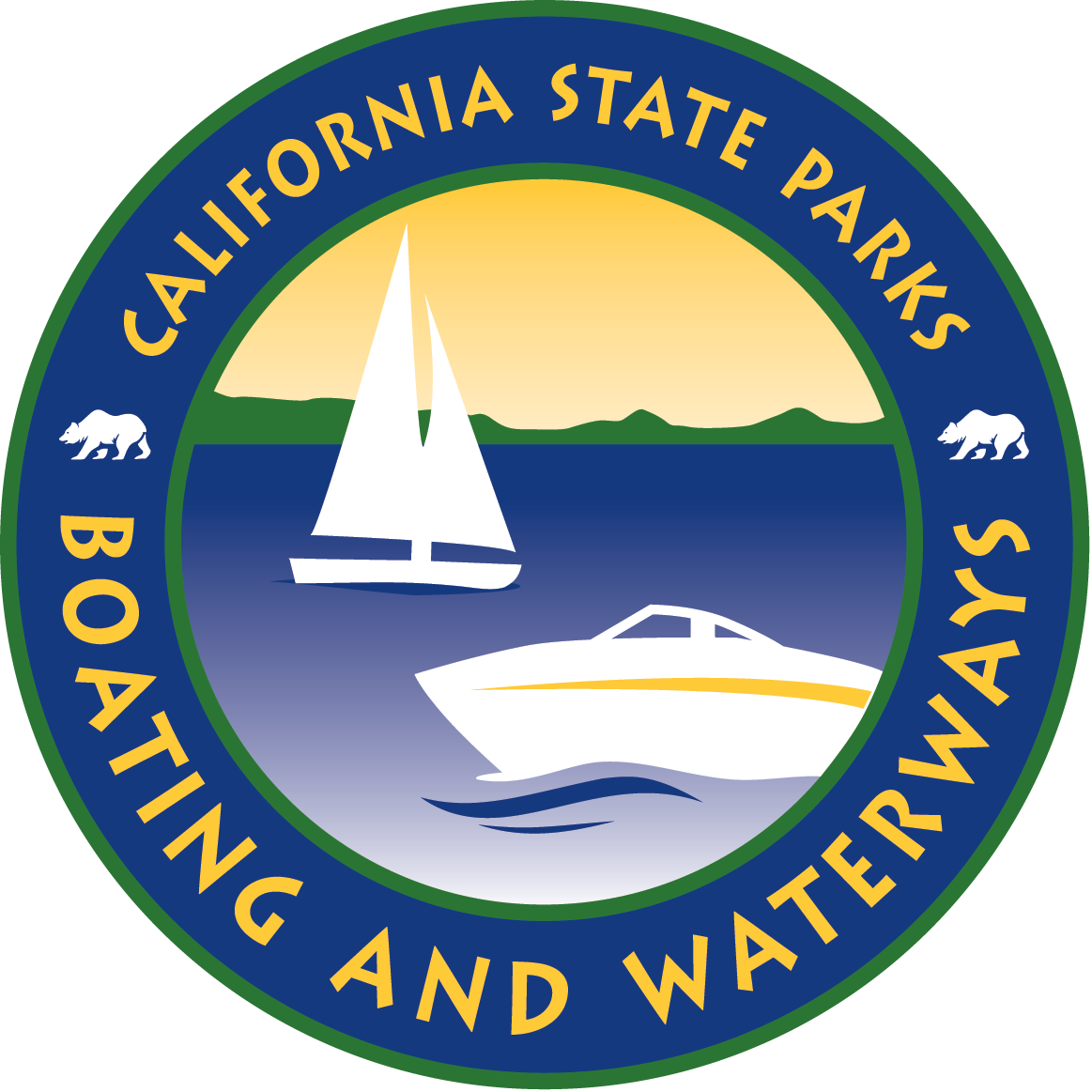
- Official seal as of July 1, 2013

Agency overview
- Formed: 1957
- Preceding agencies: Department of Boating and Waterways; Division of Small Craft Harbors
- Headquarters: 715 P Street, Sacramento, California
- Annual budget: $77 million (2007)
- Agency executive: Ramona Fernandez, Deputy Director
- Parent agency: California Department of Parks and Recreation
- Website: dbw.parks.ca.gov

The Division of Boating and Waterways (DBW) is a state government agency under the California State Parks of the California Natural Resources Agency.

The division was established in 1957 upon enactment of legislation supported by the boating community. That legislation established a state boating agency dedicated to all aspects of recreational boating and a special fund (Harbors and Watercraft Revolving Fund) to fund the division’s activities. The division receives no General Fund support.

The division brings together a body of knowledge as the state’s expert in recreational boating-related matters, including public access, safety and education, marine law enforcement, and consumer and environmental protection.

For example, DBW is responsible for planning, developing, and improving facilities on state-owned and state-managed properties, including those on State Parks and State Water Project properties. It also provides funding so that local agencies can renew deteriorated facilities or develop new public access. In addition, the division is heavily involved in furthering environmentally sound boating practices through its clean and green programs.

DBW conducts and sponsors oceanographic research in marina pollution, sea level, wave measurement, modeling and prediction, beach processes, and coastal flooding and erosion, as they relate to boating facilities, access, safety, and education, and beach restoration and coastal protection. Close cooperation with Scripps Institution of Oceanography facilitate these activities.

The division serves all types of recreational boaters statewide. California has about 2.6 million recreational boats and over 4 million recreational boaters. Recreational boating annually contributes several billion dollars to the state’s economy.

The current Deputy Director of California Division of Boating and Waterways is Ms. Lynn Sadler.

== Units ==
The Division of Boating and Waterways is made of two Enforcement and Environmental units to coordinate the division's responsibilities. Between them, both units oversee 17 programs, ranging from boater safety rules to species control.

=== Pollution controls ===
California Division of Boating and Waterways heavily regulates the use of carbureted and electronic-injection two-stroke engines manufactured prior to 1989 in California waters, considering them high-emission polluters. Due to emission standards, The division has banned their use on several lakes throughout the state. Direct injection two-stroke engines made since 1989, however, are permitted on the state's waterways with some non-emission standard exceptions.

=== Non-native species removal ===
California Division of Boating and Waterways' Aquatic Pest Control Program has since 1982 targeted to control water hyacinth from state waters. A native of the Amazon River in South America, the water hyacinth was introduced to the Sacramento-San Joaquin River Delta in the early 20th century. Due to the quick blooming of the water hyacinth, the plant displaces native wildlife, blocks light needed for photosynthesis, reduces the amount of dissolved oxygen in the water, and deposits silt and organic matter at several times the normal rate. In 1997, the division added the egeria densa, another South American native, onto its list of species targeted for control and eradication.

== See also ==
- California Department of Parks and Recreation
- California Environmental Protection Agency
- California Coastal Commission
- United States Coast Guard Auxiliary
- San Francisco Bay Area Water Trail, proposal supported by the department
