= San Francisco Estuary Partnership =

American government program

The San Francisco Estuary Partnership
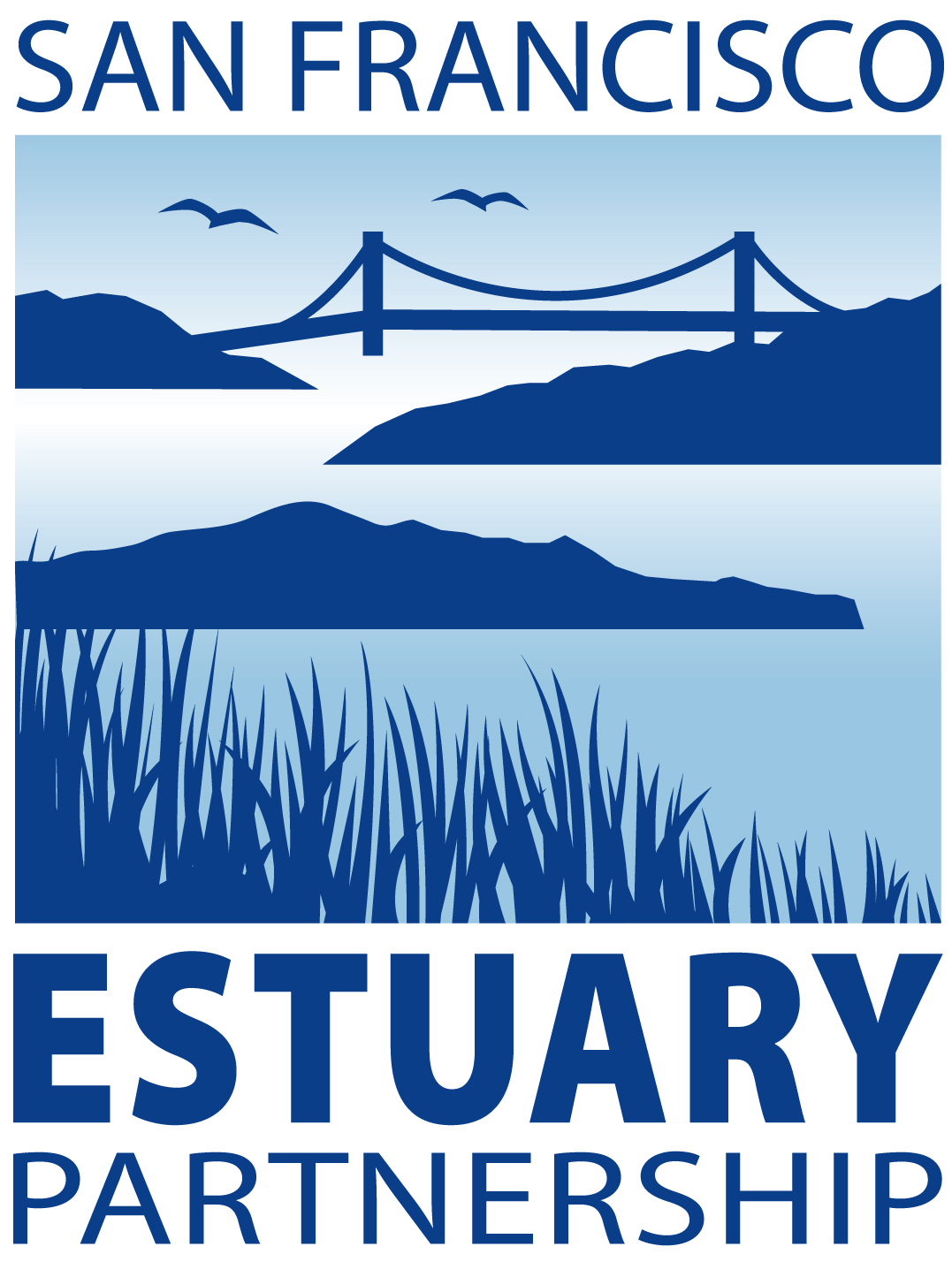
- Formation: 1987
- Type: Government Agency
- Headquarters: San Francisco, CA, USA
- Region served: San Francisco Bay Area
- Director: Caitlin Sweeney
- Website: http://www.sfestuary.org

The San Francisco Estuary Partnership (or simply the Partnership) is one of the 28 National Estuary Programs created in the 1987 Amendments to the Clean Water Act. The Partnership is a non-regulatory federal-state-local collaboration working to restore water quality and manage the natural resources of the San Francisco Bay-Sacramento–San Joaquin River Delta estuary. The Partnership works with over 100 municipalities, non-profits, governmental agencies, and businesses and helps develop, find funding for, and implement over 40 projects and programs aimed at improving the health of the estuary. The partnership either directly implements these projects, or administers and manages grants, holds educational workshops and highlights project results. The Partnership is also the official representative for the San Francisco Bay region to the Most Beautiful Bays in the World.

The Partnership's office is colocated with the Association of Bay Area Governments in the Bay Area Metro Center.

== Goals and Guiding Documents ==
SFEP's work and mission are detailed in the Comprehensive Conservation and Management Plan. First completed in 1993 and revised in 2007, 2016, and 2022, the most recent version of the document—now called the San Francisco Estuary Blueprint—is organized around four goals, 13 objectives, and 25 actions.

The Plan, collaboratively produced by consensus agreement of a broad community of stakeholders, recommends actions to protect and restore the San Francisco Bay-Delta Estuary. It is the region's roadmap for restoring the Estuary's chemical, physical, and biological health. The 2022 Plan includes new and revised actions, such as the need to address sea level rise, while retaining many of the original actions.

== History ==
The National Estuary Program (NEP) was established under Section 320 of the 1987 Clean Water Act Amendments as a non-regulatory, place-based program, managed by the U.S. Environmental Protection Agency (EPA), to protect and restore the water quality and ecological integrity of the nation's estuaries. Each NEP was required to develop and implement a Comprehensive Conservation and Management Plan identifying actions to address the water quality, habitat, and living resources challenges within its watershed. San Francisco Bay was identified in the founding legislation as one of seven estuaries of national concern. Currently, the NEP is composed of 28 site specific programs. Each of these NEP's has created an individual Comprehensive Conservation and Management Plan and is working to successfully restore and maintain the water quality and ecological integrity of that estuary.

Work began on the San Francisco Bay NEP in 1987. Over 100 agency, non-profit and business partners came together over a five-year planning period to create the San Francisco Bay Comprehensive Conservation and Management Plan. The plan was approved by EPA and California governor Pete Wilson in late 1993.

== The Partnership's organization ==
The Partnership is a federal/state/local collaboration. The US EPA, the Regional Water Quality Control Board, and the Association of Bay Area Governments are the lead agencies that guide the Partnership's work. SFEP is supported by a Director and a number of staff. Two committees, an Executive Council and the Implementation Committee (IC), provide advice and guidance. The IC meets quarterly and includes over 25 member organizations representing resource agencies, nonprofits, local governments, and the business community. The Executive Council is made up of heads of state, Federal and local agencies, and meets when needed.

The Partnership's employees are all staff of the Association of Bay Area Governments, otherwise known as ABAG. The Bay Area Metro Center provides office space, equipment, and office overhead costs as state match to the Partnership while ABAG provides management, administrative, and fiscal support.

An Executive Council meets as necessary to provide overall program guidance. The Council members include the Executive Director of ABAG, the current U.S. EPA Regional Administrator, Region 9, U.S. Fish and Wildlife Service California Nevada Regional Director, the Secretary of California EPA, and the Secretary of the California Resources Agency.

The Implementation Committee serves as the oversight committee for the Partnership, and advises implementation efforts, helps set priorities, and supports work plans and budgets. Members represent local/state/federal agencies, business/industry, and environmental organizations. As called for in the Strategic Plan, a Science Committee is being formed, and a steering committee has been established to provide ongoing advice to the Director.
