= Association of Bay Area Governments =

Regional planning agency in the San Francisco Bay Area

Association of Bay Area Governments (ABAG)
Agency overview
- Formed: 1961
- Jurisdiction: San Francisco Bay Area
- Headquarters: 375 Beale St. Ste. 700, San Francisco, CA 94105
- Agency executive: Belia Ramos, ABAG President
- Website: https://abag.ca.gov

The Association of Bay Area Governments (ABAG) is a regional planning agency incorporating various local governments in the San Francisco Bay Area in California. It encompasses nine counties surrounding the San Francisco Bay. Those counties are Alameda, Contra Costa, Marin, Napa, San Francisco, San Mateo, Santa Clara, Solano, and Sonoma. It has the ability to establish housing and transportation goals for cities to minimize urban sprawl by requiring that housing be zoned for near new workplace construction. It deals with land use, housing, environmental quality, and economic development. Non-profit organizations as well as governmental organizations can be members. All nine counties and 101 cities within the Bay Area are voluntary members of ABAG.

As an advisory organization, ABAG has limited statutory authority. It is governed by its General Assembly, which consists of an elected official (delegate) from each city and county which is a member of the organization. The General Assembly determines policy, adopts the annual budget and work program, and reviews policy actions taken or proposed by the organization's Executive Board. A majority of city and county votes are required for action.

The organization is associated with such agencies and projects as the San Francisco Bay Trail and the San Francisco Estuary Partnership.

ABAG works with other regional agencies, including the Metropolitan Transportation Commission (MTC), Bay Area Air Quality Management District, and San Francisco Bay Conservation and Development Commission, to promote sustainable development by working in partnership with city and county governments to establish both Priority Development Areas and Priority Conservation Areas. These local actions will, in turn, help achieve a more efficient, equitable, and environmentally sustainable region.

== History ==
ABAG was formed in 1961. In 1970, it issued its Regional Plan, 1970-1990, the Bay Area's first comprehensive regional plan. The document outlined a regional open space plan, regional information systems and technology support, criminal justice and training, water policy and waste collection, and earthquake hazards and planning.

ABAG, along with the MTC, worked together to develop and implement Plan Bay Area in 2013 as a transportation and land-use/housing strategy through 2040.
