= California Toll Bridge Authority =

Agency of the State of California

The California Toll Bridge Authority was an agency of the State of California, responsible for the building and acquisition of toll bridges, and for the management and operations of toll bridges and "highway crossings" owned by the state. It was created by legislative act in 1929 (Stats. 1929, Ch.763, p.1480). It was abolished by legislative act in 1977 and its responsibilities transferred to the newly created California Transportation Commission (Stats. 1977, Ch. 1106), effective in 1978. A separate successor agency, the Bay Area Toll Authority, was created in 1997 to operate the state's toll bridges in the San Francisco Bay Area, while tolls were eventually removed on the state's Southern California bridges by 2002.

== History ==
The first project of the Authority was the construction of the San Francisco–Oakland Bay Bridge.

On September 16, 1940, the Authority purchased two private toll bridges, the Carquinez Bridge and the Antioch Bridge.

On December 29, 1947, Director of Public Works Charles H. Purcell created the Division of San Francisco Bay Toll Crossings to carry out the planning, construction, and operations of all state-owned toll bridges.

On September 12, 1951, the Authority purchased two private toll bridges, the San Mateo–Hayward Bridge and the Dumbarton Bridge.

On November 7, 1952, the Authority authorized the issuance of the first bonds for the construction of the Richmond–San Rafael Bridge.

On June 16, 1955, the Authority authorized the issuance of bonds for the construction of the Benicia–Martinez Bridge and a second Carquinez Bridge.

On November 18, 1963, by state legislation, the Division of San Francisco Bay Toll Crossings was re-named the "Division of Bay Toll Crossings", and established as a statutory unit of the State Department of Public Works.

In 1959, the Authority authorized the issuance of bonds for the San Pedro-Terminal Island Bridge (subsequently re-named the Vincent Thomas Bridge), but only after additional funding was obtained from the State of California as the bonds were considered insufficient.

On May 14, 1964, the Authority authorized the construction of the San Diego–Coronado Bridge.

Overlapping authority over the operation of the various toll bridges existed with the Division of Highways Bridge Department, and with the Division of Bay Toll Crossings.
