= John V. Robinson =

American writer and photojournalist (born 1960)

- Born: April 9, 1960 (age 66)
- Education: UC Berkeley
- Occupations: Writer, speaker, photographer
- Writing career
- Genres: Construction, folklore, pop culture
- Notable works: 1)Spanning the Strait: Building the Alfred Zampa Memorial Bridge. 2)Bridging the Tacoma Narrows. 3)Carquinez Bridge: 1927-2007.
- Notable awards: Guggenheim Fellowship 2006

John V. Robinson (born 1960) is an American writer and photojournalist who specializes in photographing heavy construction work with a focus on bridge construction and the men and women who do the work. Robinson goes onto construction sites and does detailed photo essays of the iron workers, pile drivers, carpenters, laborers, and crane operators who do this demanding and dangerous work. He frequently collects oral histories of the workers.

Robinson at Tacoma Narrows Bridge Project. Copyright 2006 Gav Thorpe

Robinson also does freelance photography work and his construction shots are frequently published in San Francisco Bay Area newspapers, used in calendars, and used in advertising campaigns of construction and engineering firms. John Robinson's photo-essays on bridge construction and history have been published in nine books and his articles and photographs regularly appear in professional and trade journals like The Ironworker and Engineering News Record.

John Robinson was educated at U.C. Berkeley where he took a B.A. in English Literature in 1995. He went on to San Francisco State University where in 1998 he earned a master's degree in English Literature. After finishing graduate school in 1998 Robinson begin teaching at Diablo Valley College in Pleasant Hill, CA. Currently Robinson teaches at Las Positas College in Livermore CA and Cal State East Bay in Hayward CA.

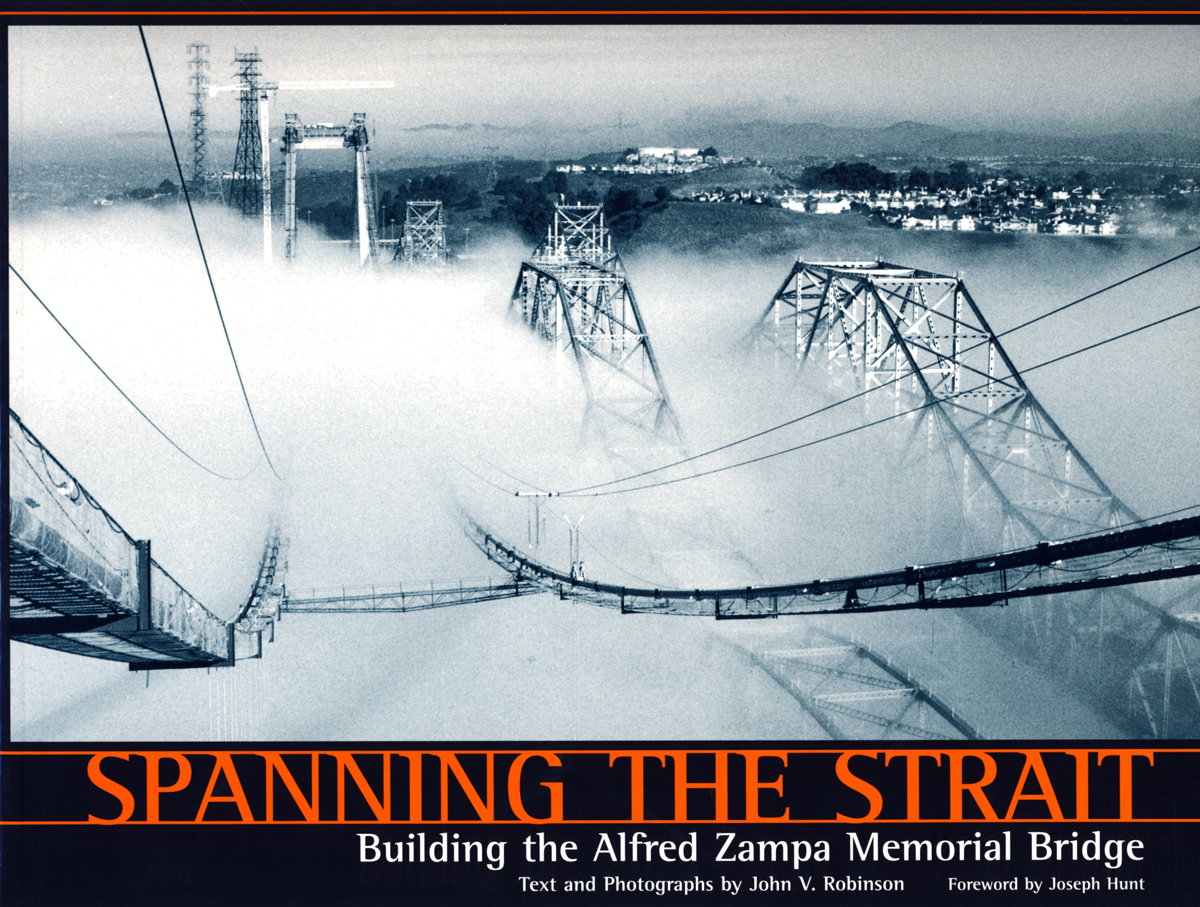
Cover of Spanning the Strait. Copyright 2004 John V. Robinson

While a student at U.C. Berkeley Robinson developed in interest in the folklore of working men and women. He studied folklore with the Berkeley folklorist Alan Dundes and developed a close friendship with eminent folklorist Archie Green and worked with Green on several projects for the Fund for Labor Culture & History.

He began his study of bridge builders in 1995 by interviewing the famed bridge builder Alfred Zampa who is most notable for being one of the first people to survive falling off the Golden Gate Bridge. Zampa was a charter member of the Half Way to Hell Club, whose members are the men who fell from the Golden Gate Bridge and were saved by the nets. The Zampa interview Robinson collected in 1995 was recently published in the 2015 book, Bay Area Iron Master Al Zampa. The book also contains The Ace, a play written by Isabelle Maynard, based on Al Zampa's experience building the Golden Gate Bridge.

In 1999 he merged his interests in photography and folklore and began photographing construction workers for an article he was researching on the labor-lore tradition called topping-out. This article was published in Western Folklore in 2001 and has been widely cited by others writing on the topping-out custom. Robinson's writing and photography have been instrumental in bringing more public attention to the mysterious Bay Bridge Troll (as well as the twin troll).

In 2001 Robinson began photographing the construction of Alfred Zampa Memorial Bridge and in 2004 published his first book, Spanning the Strait: Building the Alfred Zampa Memorial Bridge. The success of Spanning the Strait brought Robinson's work to the attention of contractors, transportation agencies, and engineering firms, who have commissioned him to do other large construction projects. In 2007 two such long-term projects resulted in the publication of Building the Benicia-Martinez Bridge and Bridging the Tacoma Narrows. Both books are published by Carquinez Press.

The publication of his books and articles have led Robinson to be interviewed for such shows as: Modern Marvels "Oakland Bay Bridge," and National Geographic Channel's "Break it Down: Bridge."

In 2006 Robinson was awarded a Guggenheim Fellowship in the field of Folklore and Popular Culture to study the traditions of high-steel iron workers. In 2007 he received a grant from the California Council for the Humanities to continue his photography project on the demolition of the 1927 Carquinez Bridge. A book on that project, titled Carquinez Bridge: 1927-2007, was published in November 2016. Robinson's new book titled The Oakland-San Francisco Bay Bridge Troll was published in March 2018.

== Awards ==
- Crockett Community Foundation Award (2005) to document the deconstruction of the 1927 Carquinez Bridge for the Crockett History Museum.
- Guggenheim Fellowship (2006)
- California Council for the Humanities (2007)

== Books ==
- Spanning the Strait: Building the Alfred Zampa Memorial Bridge. Crockett, CA: Carquinez Press. (2004)
- Crockett. San Francisco: Arcadia Publishing. (2004)
- Al Zampa and the Bay Area Bridges. San Francisco: Arcadia Publishing. (2005)
- Port Costa. San Francisco: Arcadia Publishing. (2007)
- Bridging the Tacoma Narrows. Crockett, CA: Carquinez Press. (2007)
- Building the Benicia-Martinez Bridge. Crockett, CA: Carquinez Press. (2007)
- Bay Area Iron Master Al Zampa: A Life Building Bridges.Charleston, SC: The History Press. (2015)
- Carquinez Bridge: 1927-2007.Charleston, SC: Fonthill Media. (2017)
- The Oakland-San Francisco Bay Bridge Troll. Charleston, SC: Fonthill Media. (2018)

== See also ==
- Bay Bridge Troll
- Topping out
