= Bay Area Toll Authority =

Toll agency of the State of California

Bay Area Toll Authority (BATA)

Agency overview
- Formed: 1997
- Jurisdiction: San Francisco Bay Area
- Headquarters: Bay Area Metro Center; 375 Beale Street; San Francisco, California
- Agency executive: Jake Mackenzie, Chair
- Parent agency: Metropolitan Transportation Commission
- Website: https://mtc.ca.gov/about-mtc/what-mtc/bay-area-toll-authority-bata

The Bay Area Toll Authority (BATA) is a state agency created by the California State Legislature in 1997 to administer tolls on the San Francisco Bay Area's seven state-owned toll bridges. On January 1, 1998, the Metropolitan Transportation Commission (MTC), the transportation planning, financing, and coordinating agency for the nine-county region, assumed BATA's responsibilities. In August 2005, the California Legislature expanded BATA's responsibilities to include administration of toll revenues and joint oversight of the toll bridge construction program with Caltrans and the California Transportation Commission.

== Responsibilities ==
Bridges administered

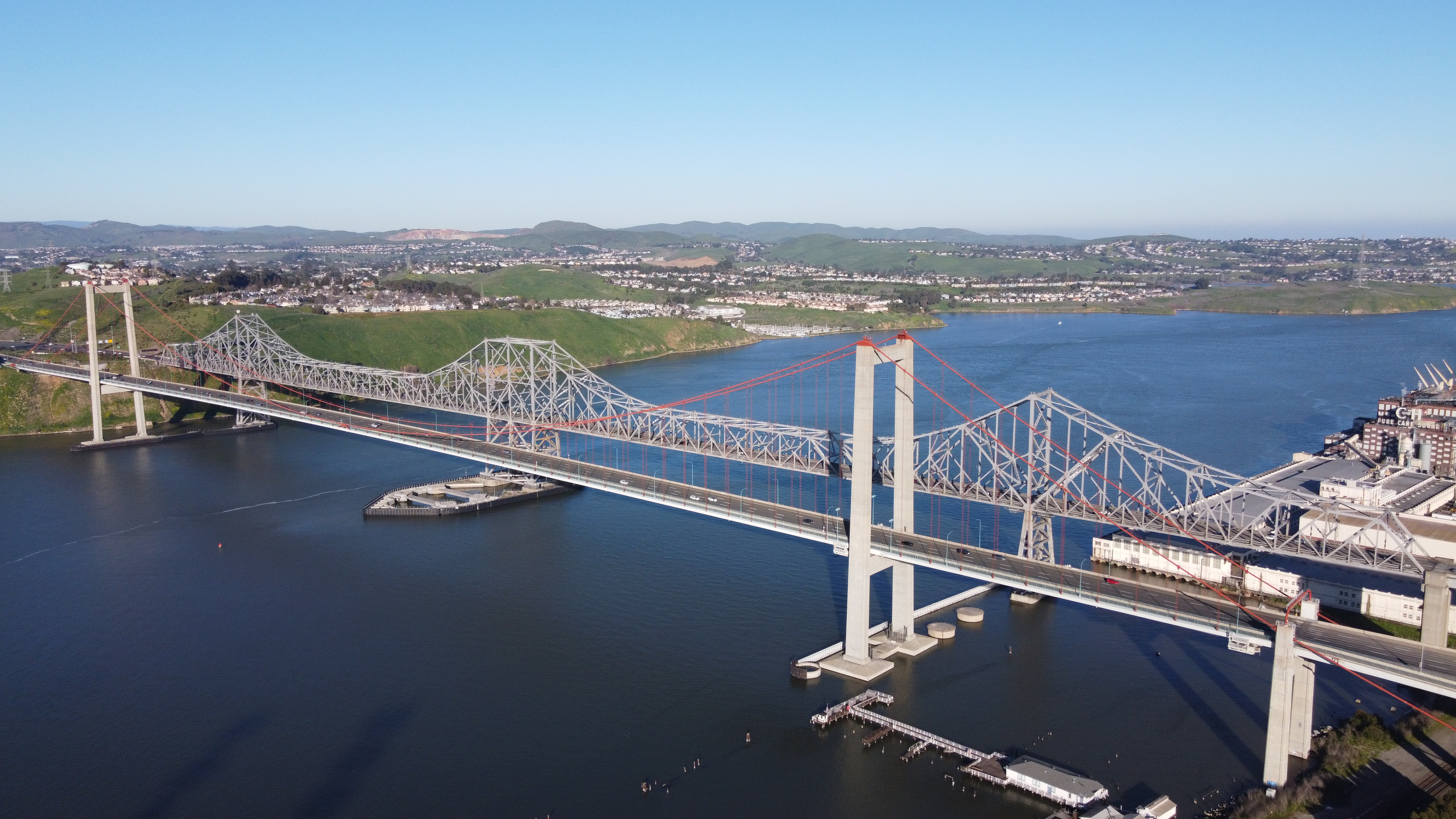
Carquinez

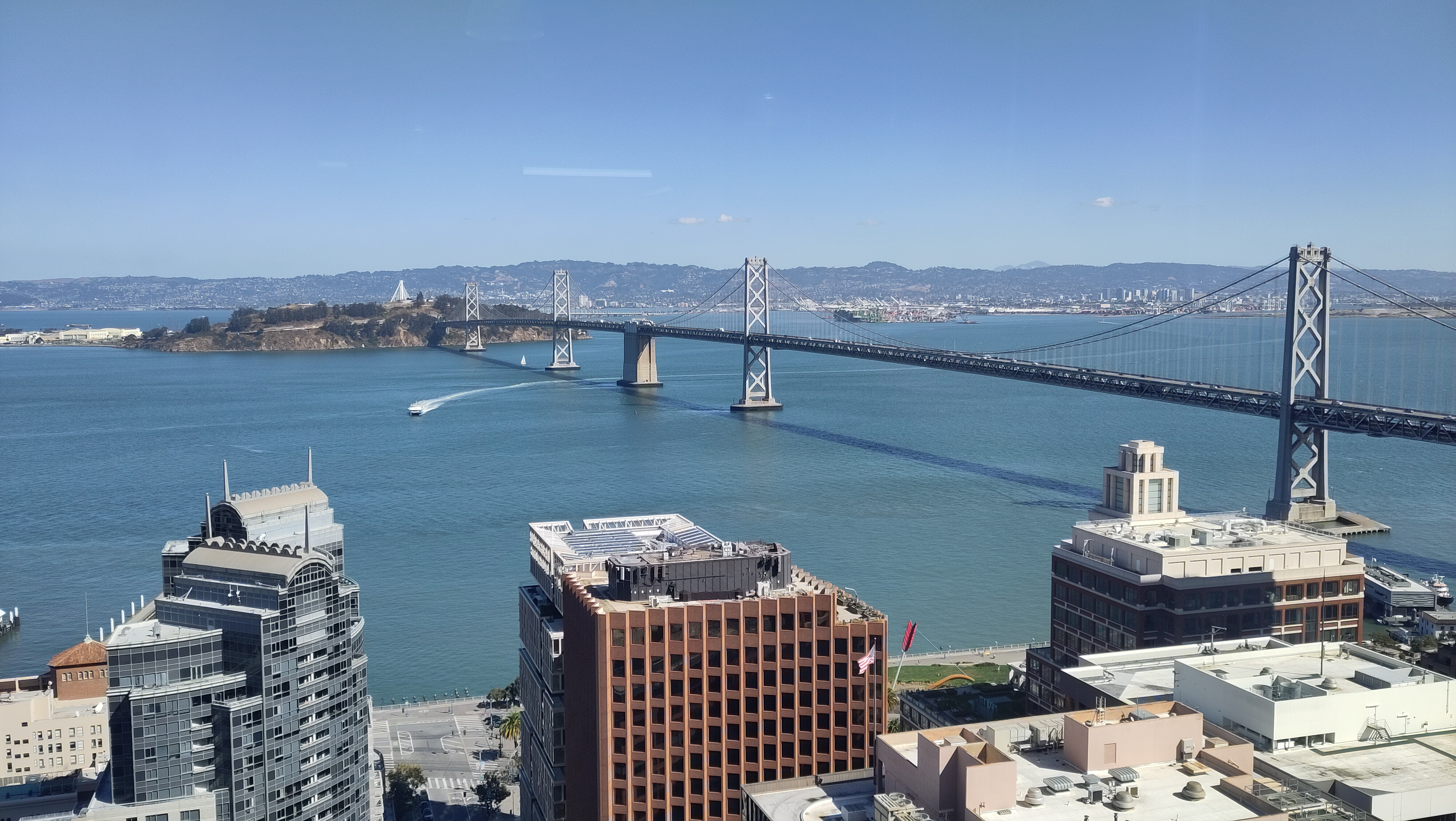
Bay Bridge

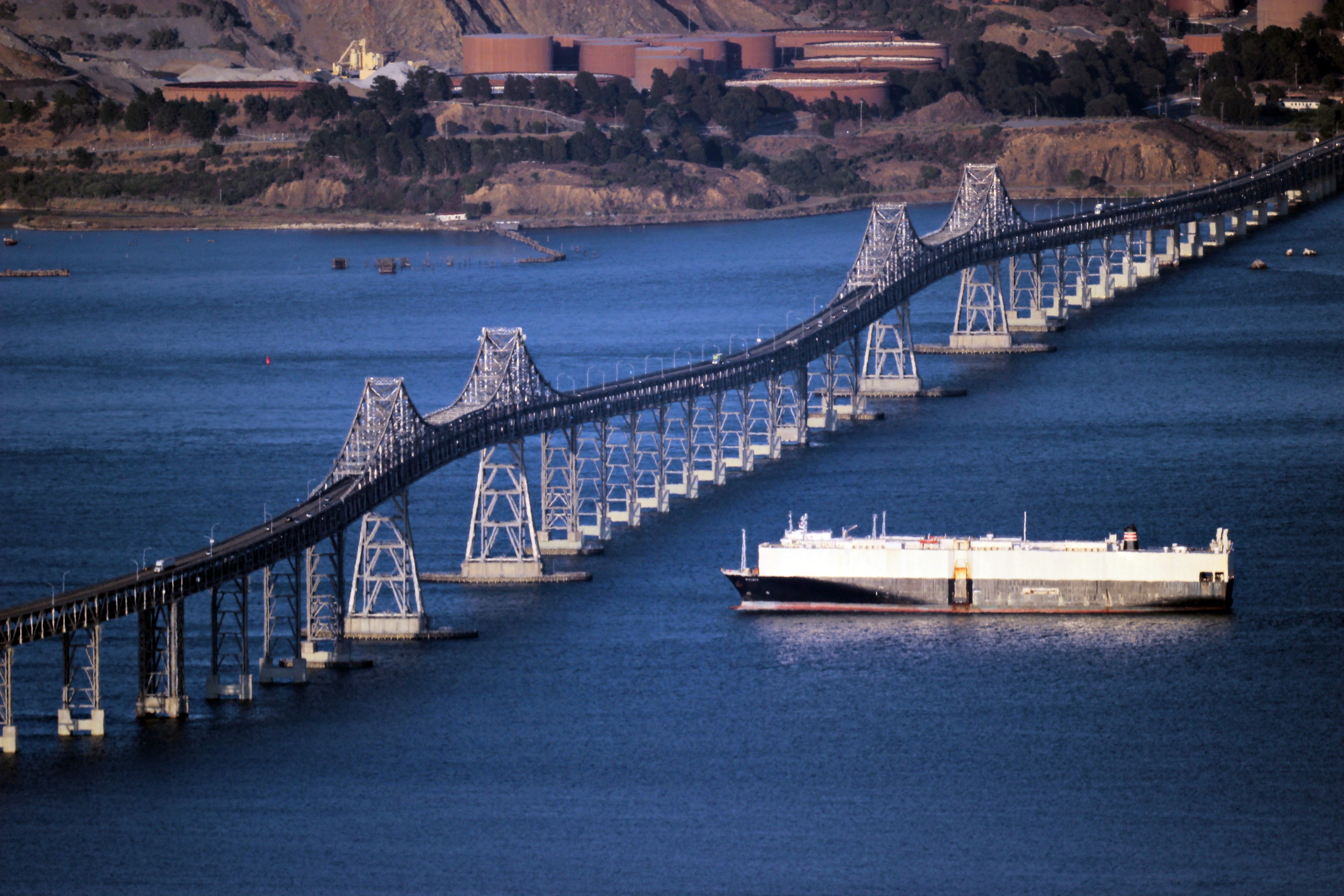
Richmond–San Rafael

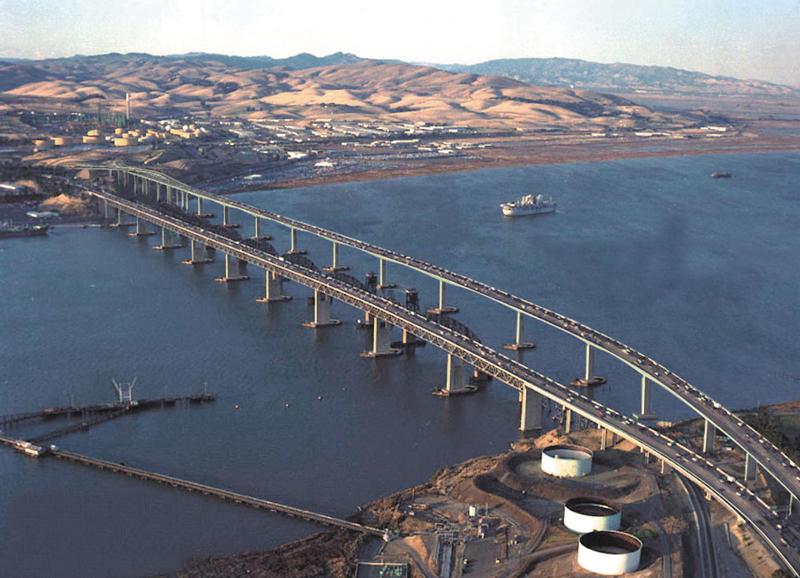
Benicia–Martinez

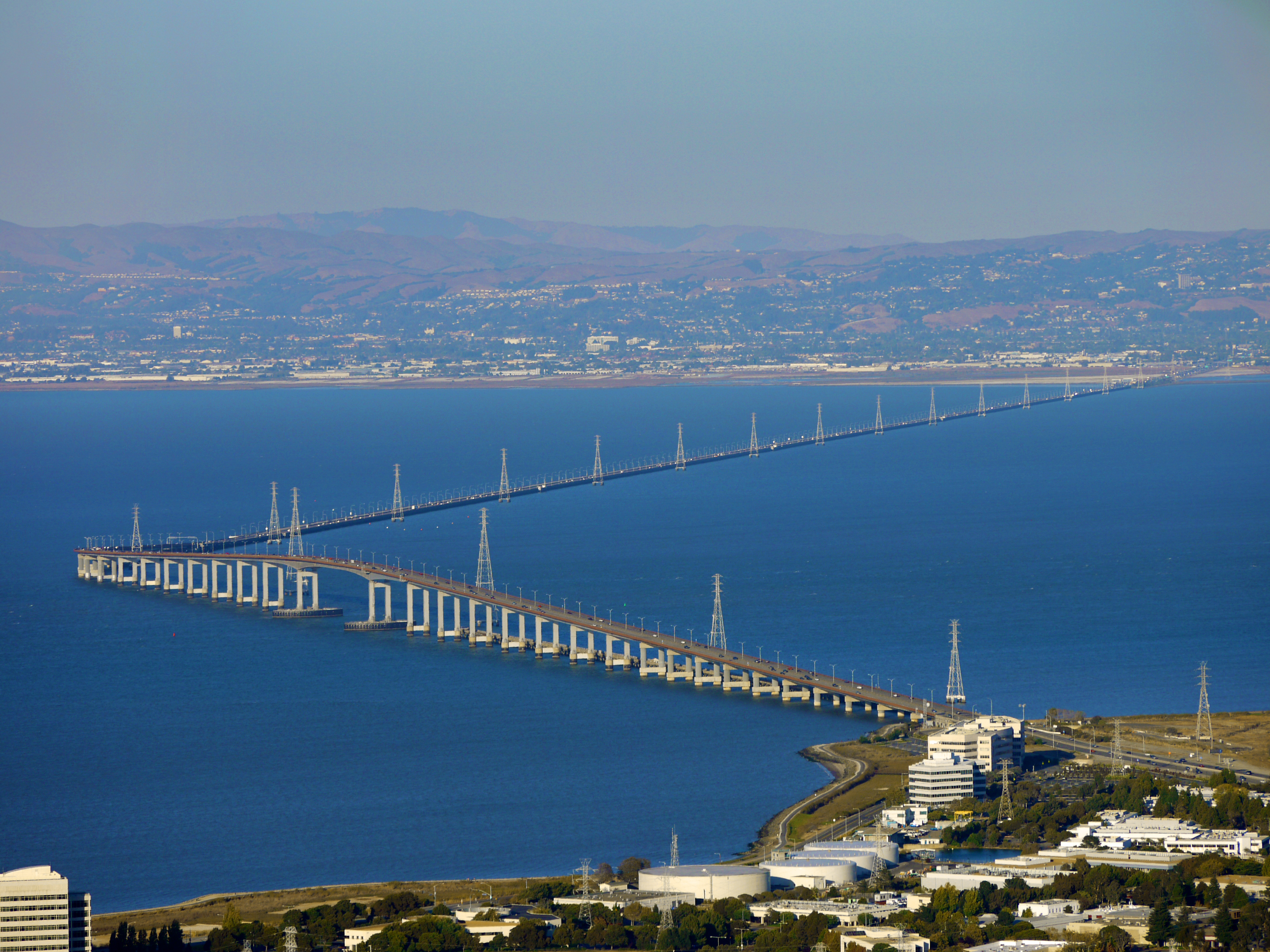
San Mateo

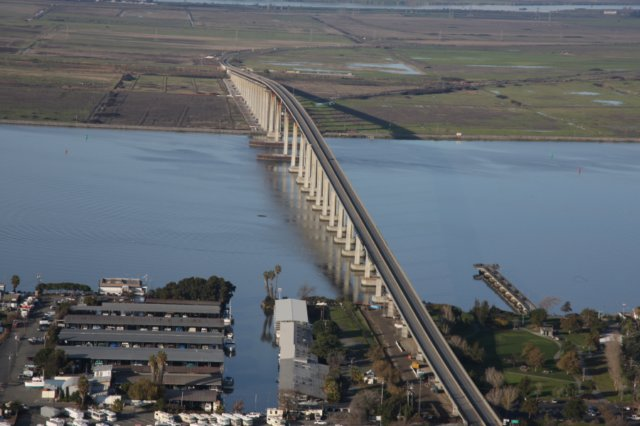
Antioch

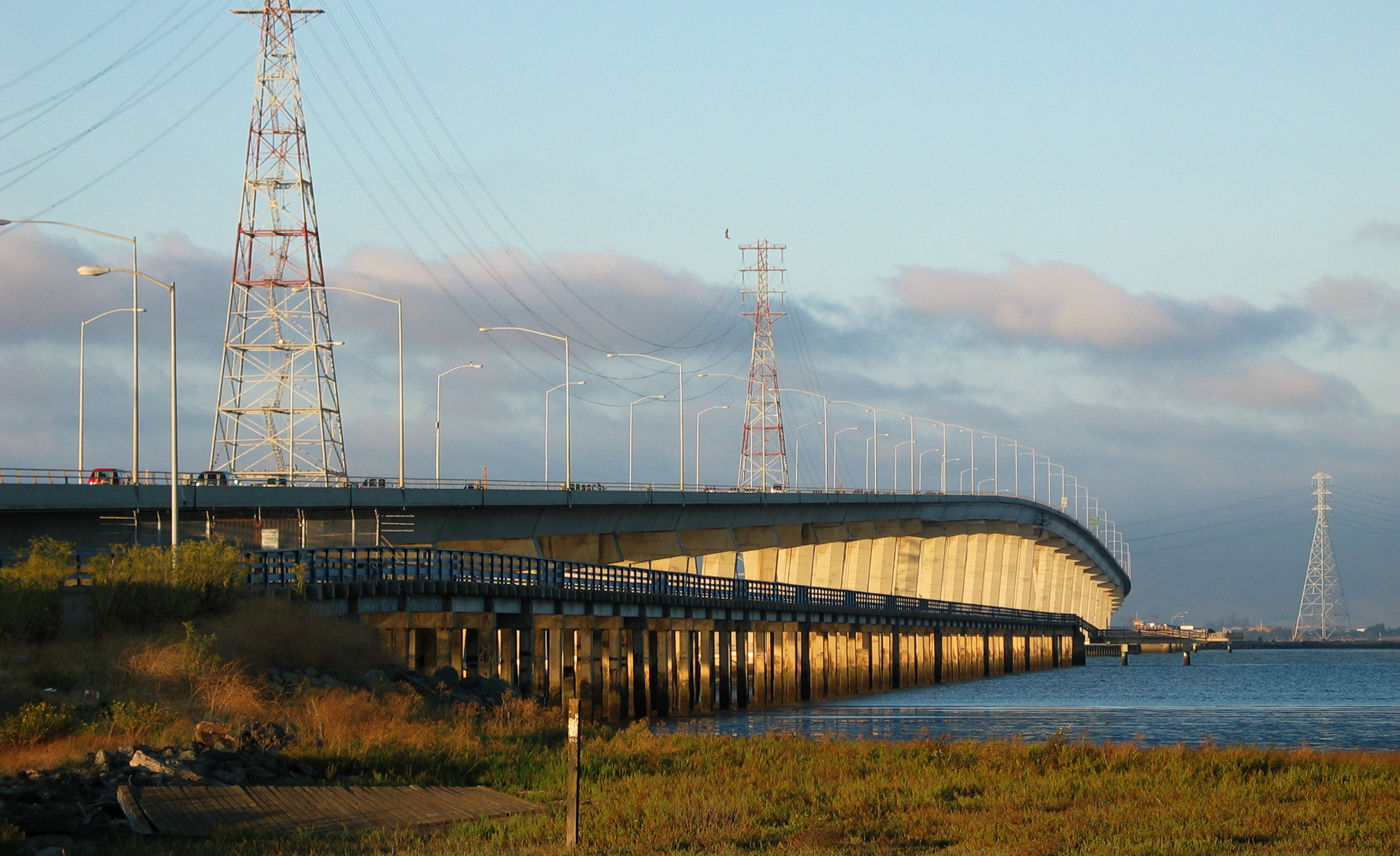
Dumbarton

BATA administers and allocates revenues from tolls collected on the seven state-owned toll bridges: Antioch, Benicia–Martinez, Carquinez, Dumbarton, Richmond–San Rafael, San Francisco–Oakland, and San Mateo–Hayward. It funds bridge operations, maintenance, administration, and long-term capital improvements, including projects authorized under Regional Measure 1 (RM 1), Regional Measure 2 (RM 2), Regional Measure 3 (RM 3), and the Toll Bridge Seismic Retrofit Program.

The Golden Gate Bridge is not under BATA's jurisdiction, as it is operated by the Golden Gate Bridge, Highway and Transportation District. BATA does, however, administer the centralized billing and customer service system for the FasTrak electronic toll collection program used by the Golden Gate Bridge, the seven state-owned toll bridges, and all high-occupancy toll lanes in the Bay Area.

== Regional Measure 1 ==
In 1988, Bay Area voters approved Regional Measure 1 (RM 1), raising tolls on the state-owned bridges to a uniform $1 and pledging the proceeds to specific bridge corridor improvements. Caltrans owns and operates the toll bridges and is responsible for the construction of the voter-approved RM 1 projects, including a new span for the Benicia-Martinez Bridge, a replacement for the west span of the Carquinez Bridge, and widening the San Mateo-Hayward Bridge. BATA is responsible for funding and overseeing the RM 1 bridge program.

== Regional Measure 2 ==
With transbay travel in the Bay Area expected to increase by approximately 40 percent over the next two decades, the California Legislature in 2002 determined that new investment in the bridge corridors was needed, along with a new revenue source.

Regional Measure 2 (RM 2), which was approved by Bay Area voters in March 2004, increased tolls on the region's state-owned bridges by $1 and funds a balanced set of transportation projects in the bridge corridors, including new mass transit options and critical highway bottleneck improvements, including the Dumbarton Express. The project list also included funding for the Salesforce Transit Center, seismic improvements and extensions for BART, Muni Metro's T Third Street, AC Transit bus service upgrades, and more.

The list of projects — called the “Regional Traffic Relief Plan” and included in the enabling legislation — will be financed by the $1 increase in tolls. MTC will be responsible for allocating the toll. BATA will be responsible for issuing bonds and for submitting updates on the Regional Traffic Relief Plan to the state Legislature.

== Regional Measure 3 ==
In 2017, the California Senate passed SB 595 to put Regional Measure 3 (RM3) on the ballot in the nine Bay Area counties. The expenditure plan for the project would allocate $4.45 billion to various transportation projects including funding for the San Francisco Downtown Rail Extension (now known as The Portal), fleet expansions for Muni Metro and BART, ferry service expansion, various road projects, and Sonoma–Marin Area Rail Transit expansion. RM3 was on the ballot in the June 2018 election in the nine counties and required a majority vote to pass. The measure passed with 55% of the votes in favor. A lawsuit challenging the legal status of the toll increase was filed but was ruled against in April 2019. Subsequently, the decision was appealed and a state appeals court ruled again in favor of the tolls in June 2020. However, the decision was again appealed to the California Supreme Court and the status of the funds were unclear until 2023. In January 2023, the California Supreme Court ruled that RM3 was legal and therefore that the funds could finally be disbursed to transit agencies.

== Toll Bridge Seismic Retrofit Program ==
Since 1998, drivers on all Bay Area state-owned bridges have paid a $1 seismic surcharge to help finance a seismic retrofit program to strengthen and reinforce bridge structures and roadways on five of the bridges in the event of a major earthquake. On January 1, 2007, the seismic surcharge increased to $2 per vehicle, and then increased to $3 on July 1, 2010.

== 2021 Electronic Toll Collection System ==
In December 2020, The Bay Area Toll Authority announced that starting in 2021, a new all-electronic toll collection system would be launched at the Antioch, Benicia-Martinez, Carquinez, Dumbarton, Richmond-San Rafael, San Francisco-Oakland Bay and San Mateo-Hayward bridges. This would not affect the statements of bridge customers using FasTrak toll tags or a License Plate Account, but patrons not enrolled in these programs will now receive a monthly invoice for all toll bridge crossings.

== See also ==
- California Toll Bridge Authority, a predecessor state toll agency that operated from 1929 to 1977
