= Metro ExpressLanes =

Transit projects around I-10 and I-110 in Los Angeles

The Metro ExpressLanes project is a transport project in Los Angeles County, California, that debuted in 2012 to "improve traffic flow and provide enhanced travel options on I-10 and I-110 in Los Angeles County". It includes a range of infrastructure developments on the Harbor Transitway and the El Monte Busway. The existing high-occupancy lanes on these transitways were converted to high-occupancy toll lanes. Associated works included a major upgrade to the El Monte bus station, expansion of Metrolink's Pomona–North station, the creation of a new transit station at Union Station, and increased park and ride capacity and bike lockers at many transit stations. In addition, new vanpool vehicles and buses will be purchased. The project was delivered by Los Angeles Metro, the California Department of Transportation, and others. The budget was $290 million and construction, which began in 2011, was completed in February 2013. Some transit improvements for the Metro J Line are still being worked on.

== Project elements ==
The Metro ExpressLanes project includes:

- Conversion of the El Monte Busway on Interstate 10 between Interstate 605 and Alameda Street (near Union Station) in Downtown Los Angeles to high-occupancy toll lanes
- Conversion of the Harbor Transitway on Interstate 110 between Harbor Gateway Transit Center and Adams Blvd in Downtown Los Angeles to high occupancy toll lanes
- Implementation of the Metro J Line
  - Enhanced bus priority system at traffic signals in Downtown Los Angeles
  - 59 new alternative fuel buses
  - Operating subsidy during a demonstration period
- Renovation and expansion of El Monte station, a large regional bus station
- A new busway station on the El Monte Busway for Union Station
- Upgrades to Harbor Transitway Park & Ride lots
- Expansion of Metrolink's Pomona–North station
- More bicycle lockers at the Harbor Gateway Transit Center
- New Bus Maintenance Facility in Downtown Los Angeles
- 100 New Metro Vanpools
- Implement Express Park in Downtown Los Angeles, an intelligent parking system allowing demand-based pricing and real-time space availability information

== Gallery ==
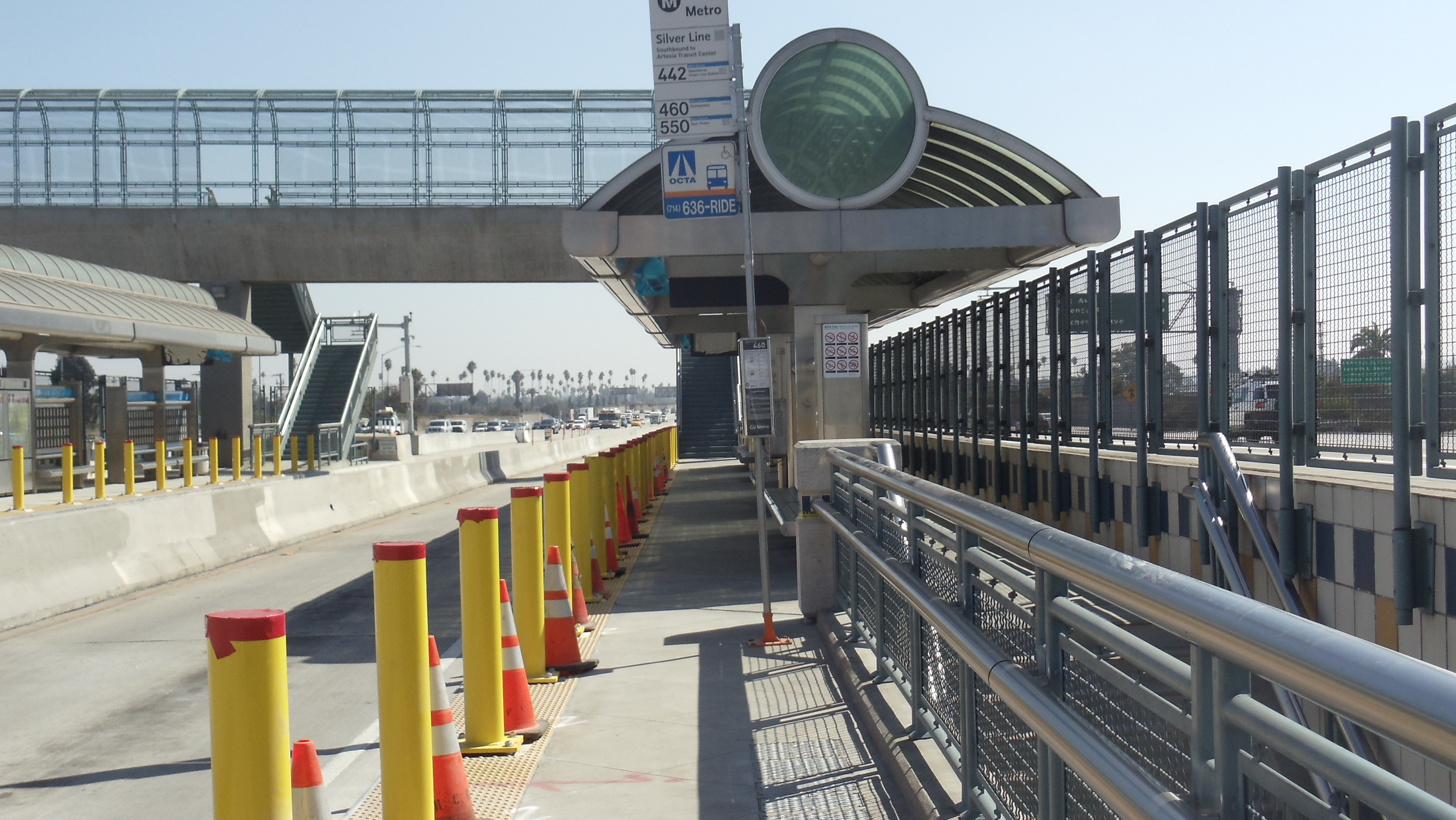
Southbound platform with bollards installed. They were installed early September 2012.

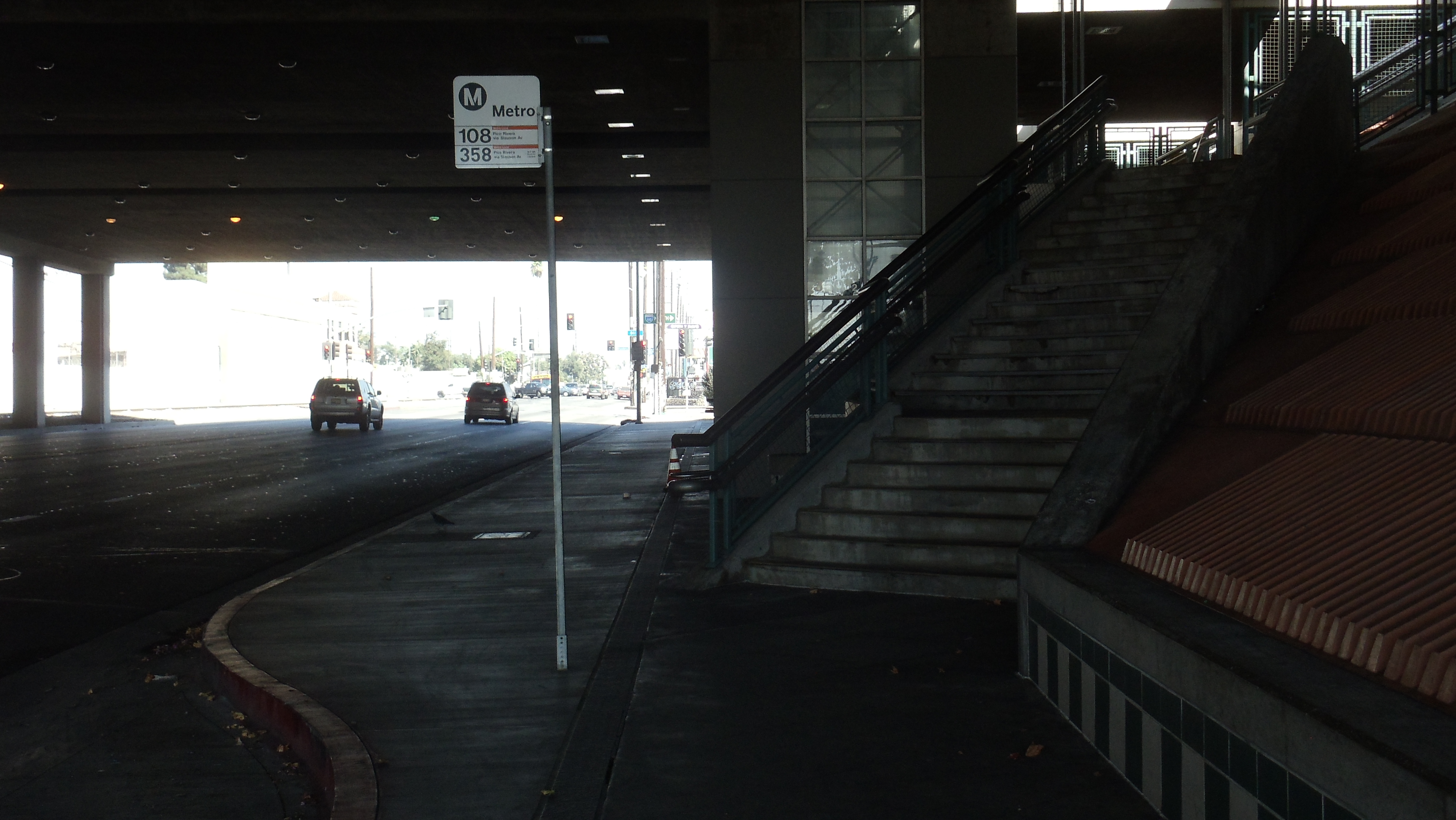
Eastbound Metro Local line 108 & Metro Limited line: 358 bus stop at Slauson Silver Line Station. The stop was added as part of the Metro Express Lanes Project. A westbound stop was not constructed.

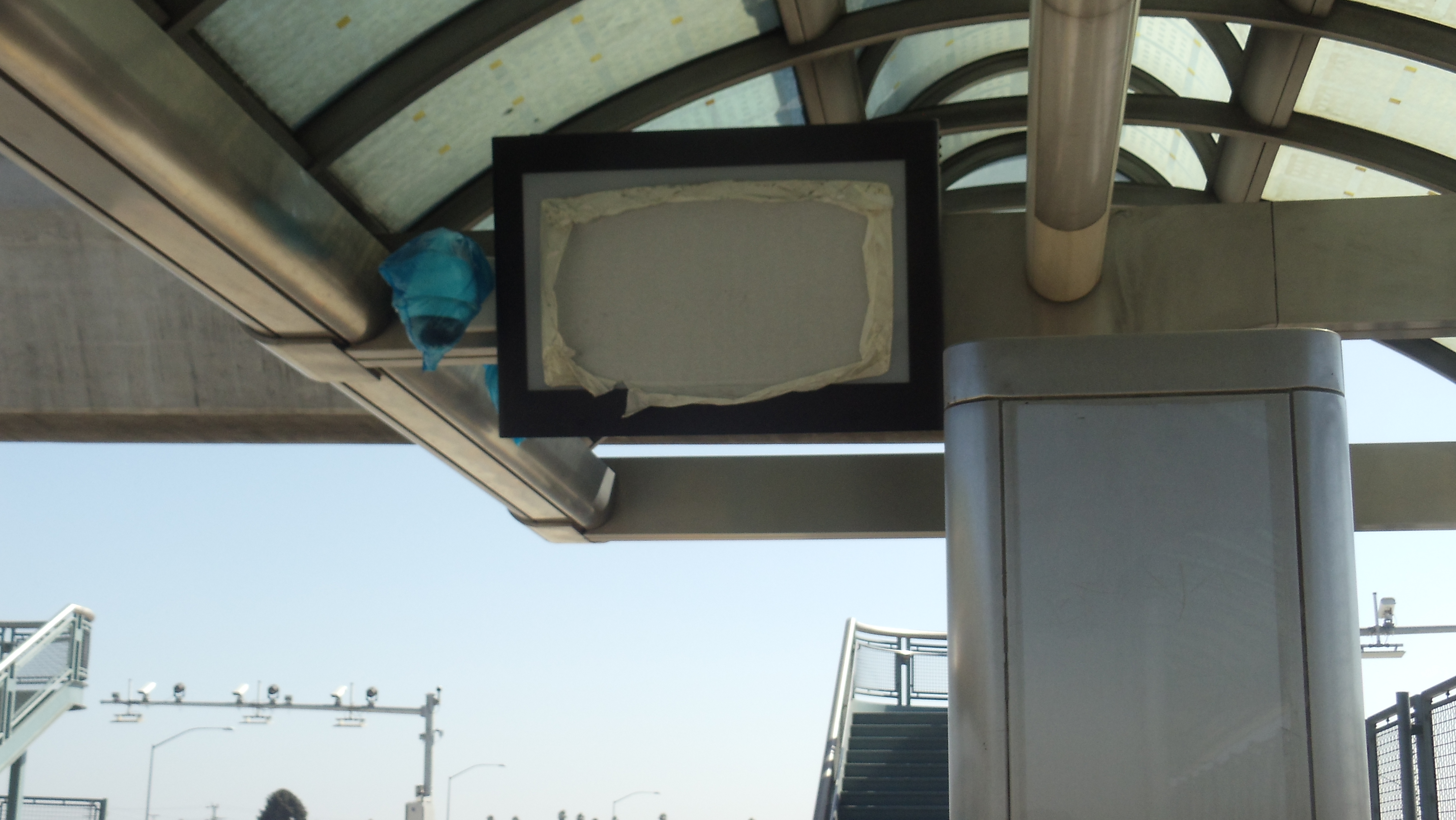
Station security cameras and digital message signs for the Metro Silver Line currently being installed at the station. This is part of the Metro Express Lanes Project.

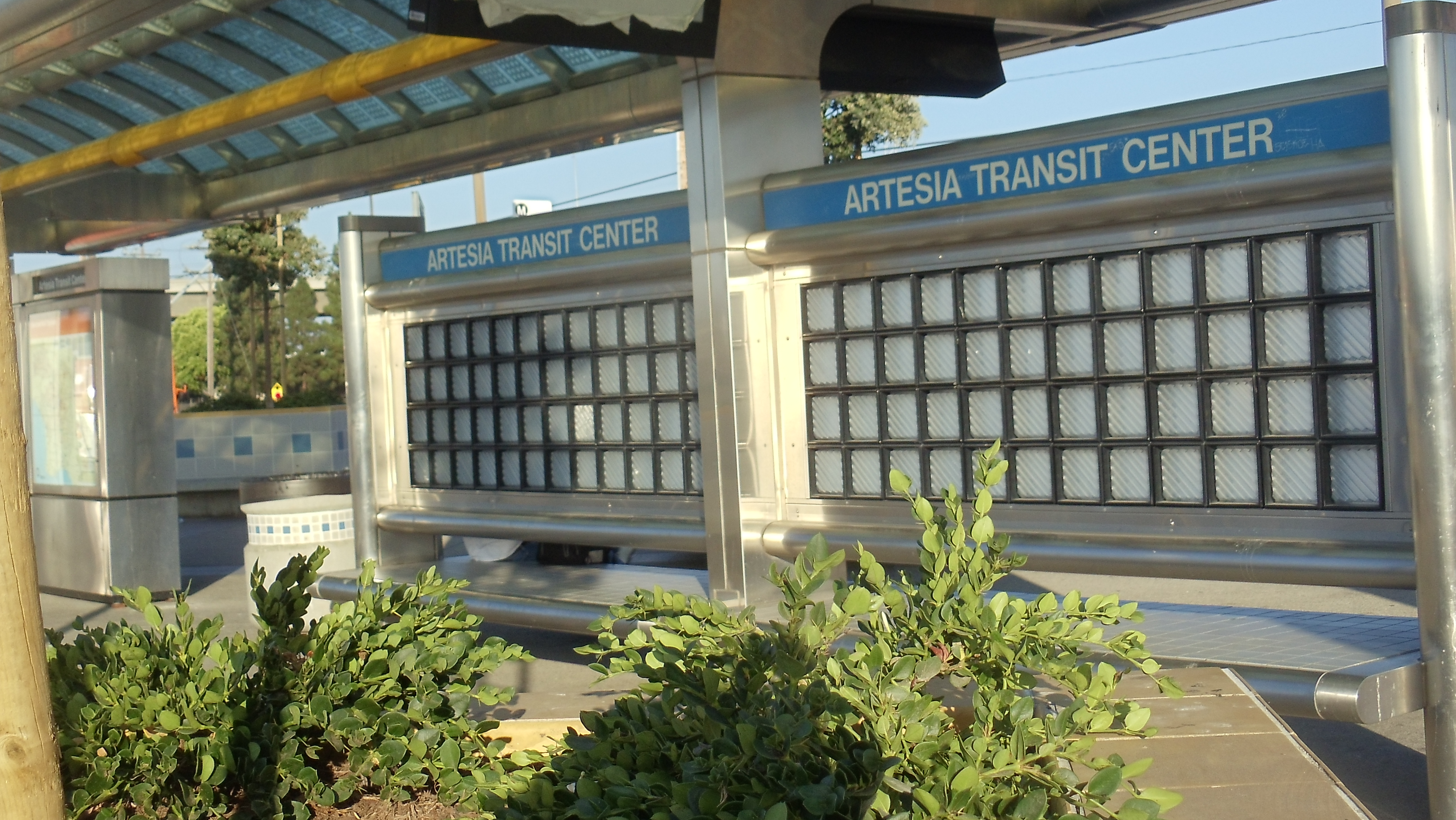
Landscaping improvements were made at the Harbor Gateway Transit Center.

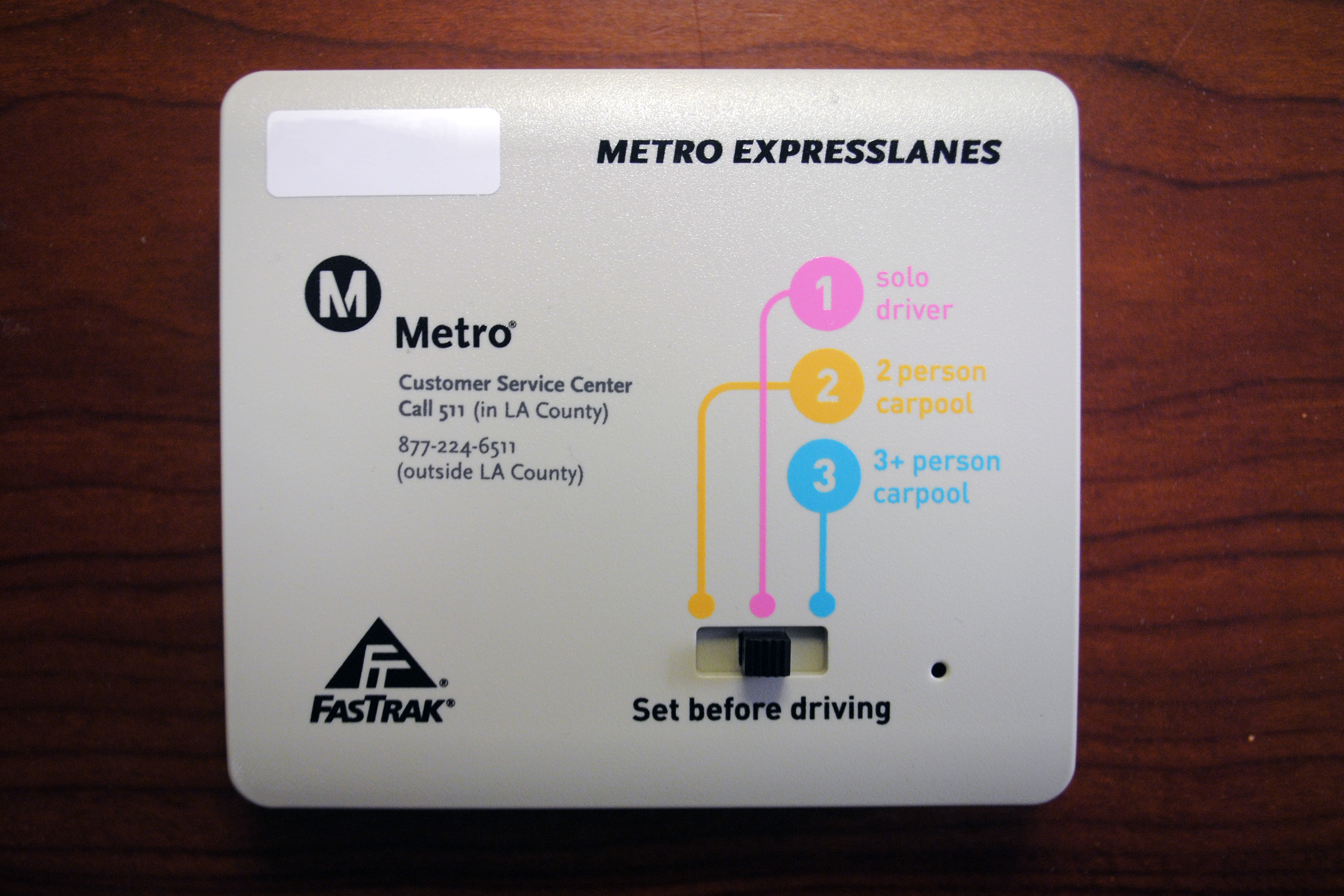
The new "switchable" FasTrak transponder used in the Metro ExpressLanes; the driver indicates the number of occupants in the vehicle using the switch, which the toll system detects and automatically computes the toll (or lack of a toll) for.

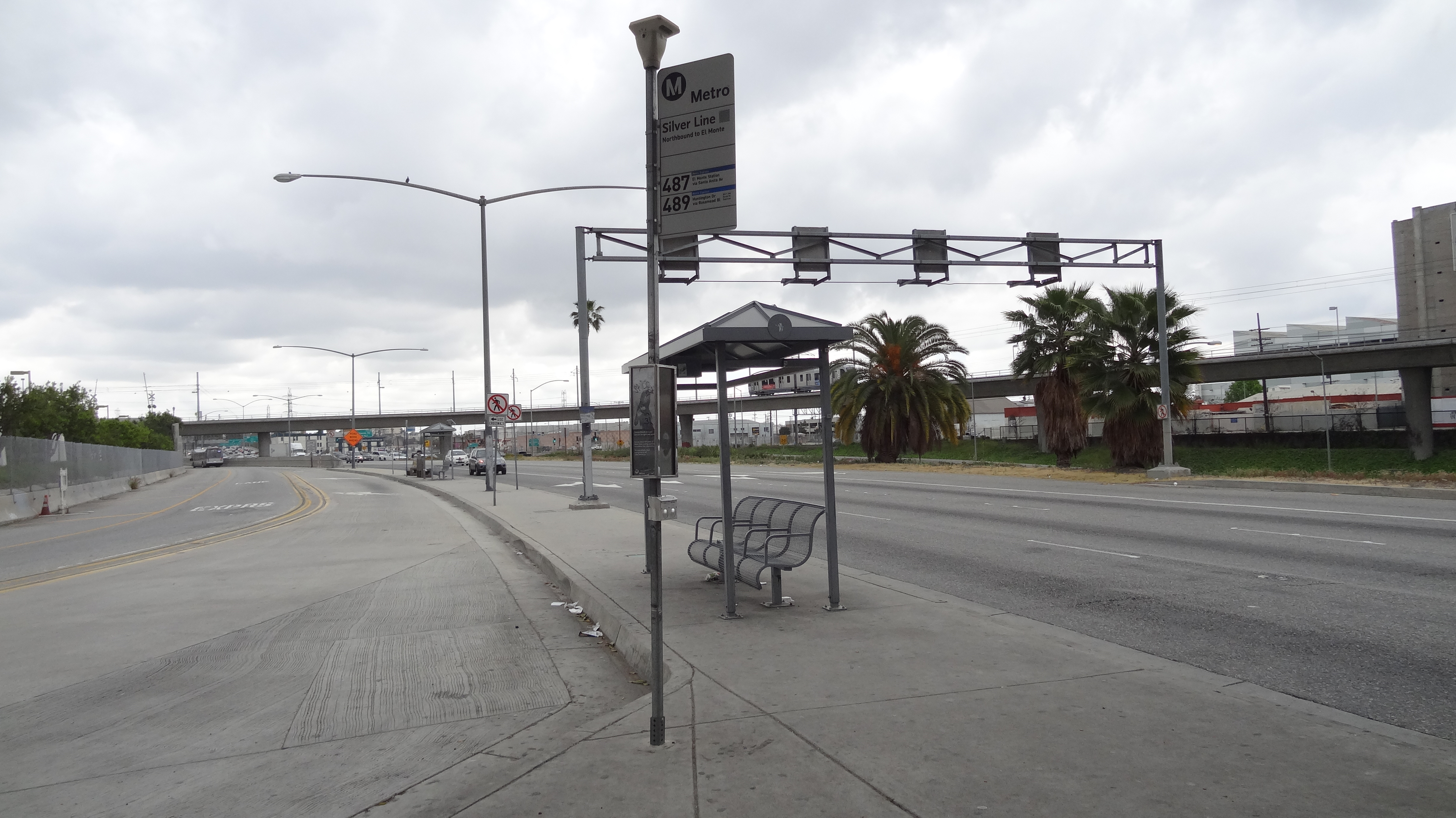
Union Station (El Monte Busway & Alameda) Metro Silver Line Stop. As part of the Metro express Lanes projects, this current bus stop will be moved next to the Patsouras Transit Plaza and the Silver Line will have a new station stop. The new busway station is being planned to be completed by 2015.
