= Benicia–Martinez Bridge =

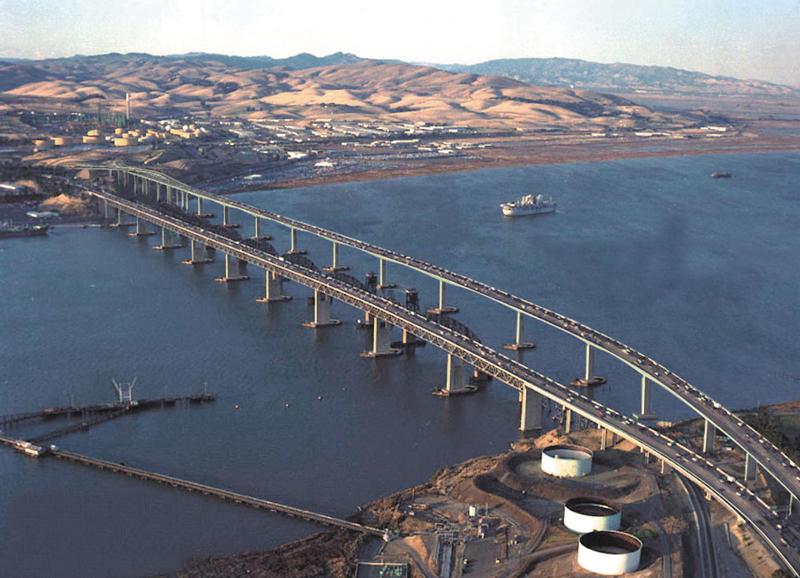
- Aerial view of the Benicia–Martinez Bridge. From left to right: Southbound span (1962) Railway (1930) and Northbound span (2007)
- Coordinates: 38°02′26″N 122°07′23″W
- Carries: 9 lanes (5 northbound, 4 southbound) of I-680; Bicycles and pedestrians on southbound span
- Crosses: Carquinez Strait
- Locale: Martinez and Benicia, California, U.S.
- Official name: George Miller Jr., Memorial Bridge (southbound span), Congressman George Miller Benicia–Martinez Bridge (northbound span)
- Owner: State of California
- Maintained by: California Department of Transportation and the Bay Area Toll Authority
- ID number: 28 0153L (1962 span); 28 0153R (2007 span)

Characteristics
- Design: Truss bridge (southbound span), segmental bridge (northbound span)
- Total length: 1.7 miles (2.72 km, 8,976 feet)
- Longest span: 528 feet (0.1 mi)
- No. of spans: 7 (southbound)
- Clearance below: 138 feet (42.1 m)

History
- Construction cost: US$25 million (southbound); US$1.3 billion (northbound)
- Opened: 1962 (southbound); 2007 (northbound)

Statistics
- Toll: Northbound only; FasTrak or pay-by-plate, cash not accepted; Effective January 1 – December 31, 2026: $8.50; $4.25 (carpool rush hours, FasTrak only)

Location
- Interactive map of Benicia–Martinez Bridge

The Benicia–Martinez Bridge refers to three parallel bridges which cross the Carquinez Strait just west of Suisun Bay in California. The spans link Benicia on the north side with Martinez on the south. A 1962 truss bridge, officially the George Miller Jr., Memorial Bridge after California state legislator George Miller Jr., carries southbound Interstate 680 traffic, bicycles, and pedestrians. A 2007 segmental bridge, officially the Congressman George Miller Benicia–Martinez Bridge after U.S. Congressman George Miller III, carries northbound Interstate 680 traffic. The middle span is a 1930 vertical-lift railroad drawbridge that carries Union Pacific and BNSF freight trains, as well as Amtrak passenger trains.

== Description ==
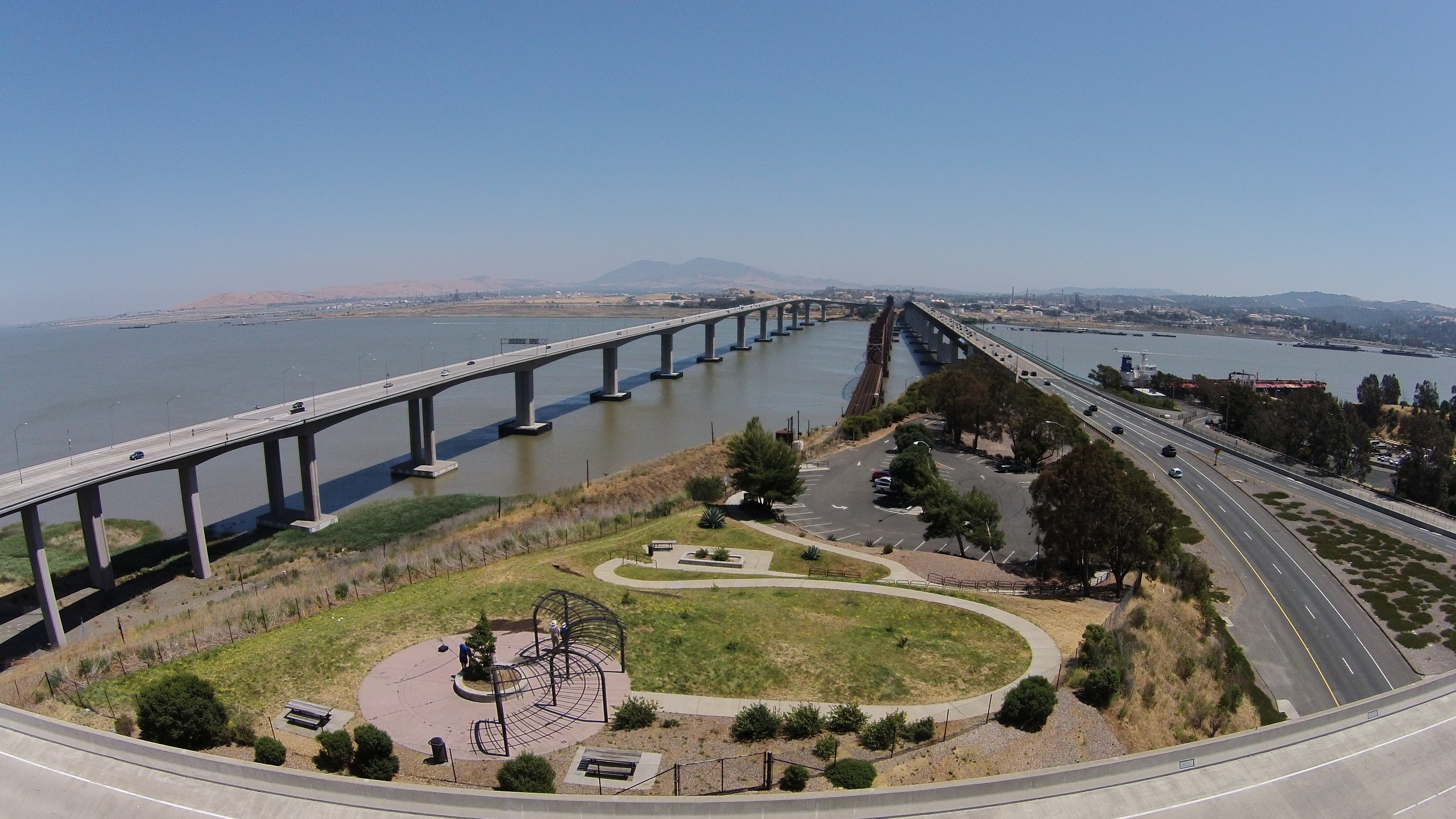
Aerial drone view of Vista Point and Benicia–Martinez Bridge, with Mount Diablo in the distance

Union Pacific Railroad's Benicia–Martinez drawbridge, opened in 1930, is between the two vehicle bridges. It is the second-longest railway bridge in North America, and the longest railway bridge west of the Mississippi River. The drawbridge has the smallest clearances of the three bridges — lift span horizontal clearance is 291 feet and vertical clearances are 70 feet (closed) and 135 feet (open). It is used by Union Pacific and BNSF (trackage rights) freight trains and 36 scheduled Amtrak passenger trains each weekday. Passenger trains include the long-distance trains California Zephyr and Coast Starlight and commuter-oriented Capitol Corridor services.

The road bridges are part of Interstate 680, a major transportation link connecting other heavily traveled freeways. The southbound road span is a 1.2-mile (1.9 km) deck truss bridge opened in 1962; it has seven 528-foot (161 m) spans and 138 feet (42 m) of vertical clearance, now carrying four lanes of southbound traffic, as well as a path for pedestrians and bicyclists. The northbound road span is a 1.7-mile (2.7 km) bridge with five lanes of traffic opened in 2007; it is the largest lightweight concrete segmental bridge in California.

A vista point is located on the north side of the span, providing an excellent view of the 3 parallel bridges passing over the Carquinez Strait with Mount Diablo in the background. It has ample parking, picnic tables and a large compass to provide orientation. This is typically the point where cyclists and pedestrians wishing to cross the bridge park their cars.

== History ==
=== Railroad bridge ===
Before the bridge was completed, ferries were used to allow the railway to cross Suisun Bay. The original ferry, built at Oakland, California in 1879 and named the Solano, was the world's largest train ferry. In 1914 the larger Contra Costa was built. In 1926 the ferries carried 93,000 passenger cars and 142,000 freight cars across the Strait.

The railroad bridge was built between 1928 and 1930 for Southern Pacific Railroad to replace its train ferry between Benicia and Port Costa, California. Train ferry service ended with the opening of the railroad bridge on October 15, 1930.

=== Original road bridge ===
The original road bridge opened in 1962 to replace the last automotive ferry service in the San Francisco Bay Area. It was named the George Miller Jr., Memorial Bridge in 1975 after California state legislator George Miller Jr. The cost of the 1962 span was US$25 million, or adjusted for inflation, equivalent to $266 million.

=== Companion road bridge ===
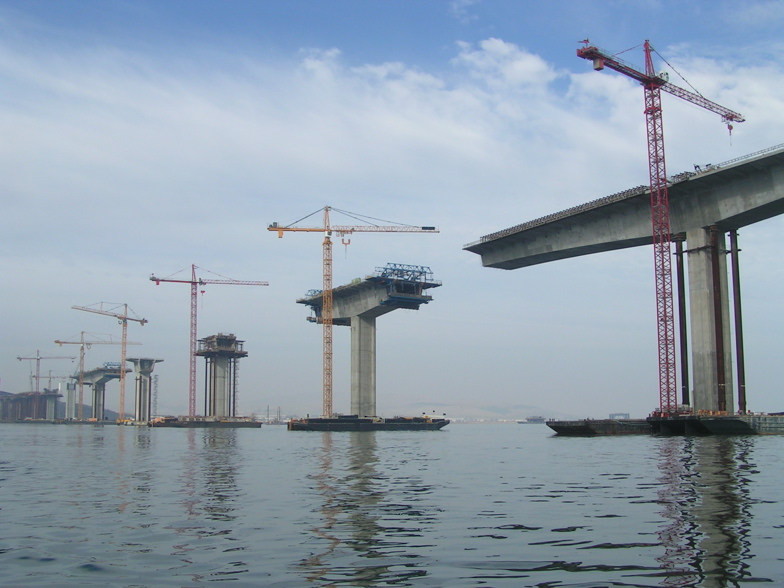
Construction of the newer bridge in 2005

Benicia–Martinez Railroad Drawbridge
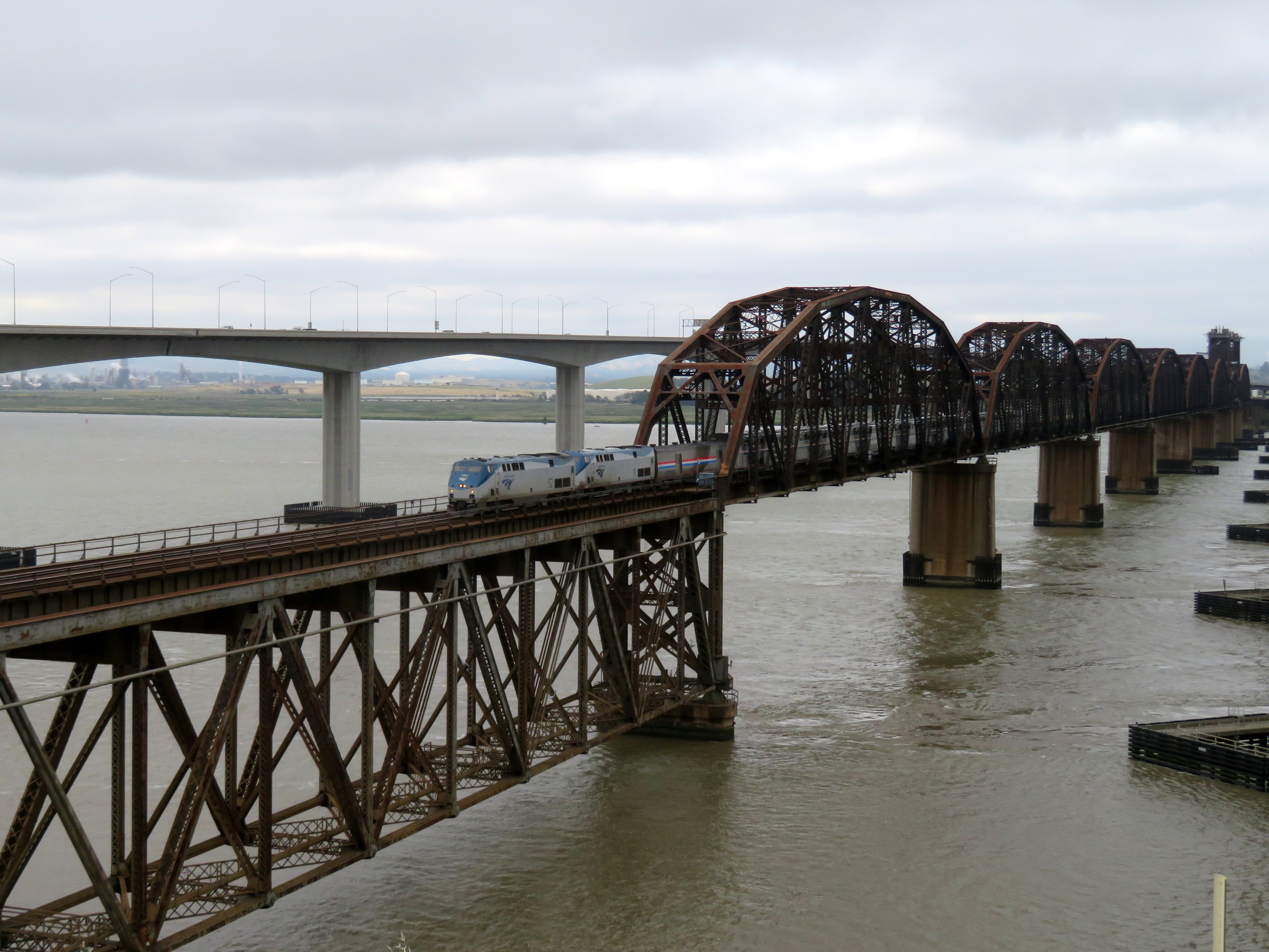
- The Amtrak California Zephyr crosses the UPRR Benicia–Martinez drawbridge
- Coordinates: 38°02′26″N 122°07′23″W
- Carries: Martinez Subdivision
- Crosses: Carquinez Strait
- Locale: Martinez and Benicia, California, U.S.
- Owner: Union Pacific Railroad

Characteristics
- Design: Vertical-lift bridge
- Total length: 5,603 ft 6 in (1,707.95 m)
- Clearance below: 135 feet (41 m) (open); 70 feet (21 m) (closed)

Rail characteristics
- No. of tracks: 2
- Track gauge: 4 ft 8 1/2 in (1,435 mm) standard gauge

History
- Designer: S. A. Roake
- Constructed by: Southern Pacific Railroad
- Construction start: 1928
- Construction cost: US$12,000,000
- Opened: 1930

Statistics
- Daily traffic: 36 Amtrak trains (weekdays)

Location
- Interactive map of Benicia–Martinez Railroad Drawbridge

In late 2001, construction began on a newer bridge east of and parallel to the railroad bridge.

The older bridge underwent seismic retrofits and was converted from carrying three lanes in each direction to carrying four lanes of southbound traffic and a bicycle/pedestrian lane, part of the San Francisco Bay Trail.

The bridge construction included a new toll plaza with nine toll booths, two open road tolling lanes to encourage FasTrak use, and one carpool lane at the south end of the bridge, although tolls continue to be charged only for northbound traffic. This required the removal of eight toll booths. The old toll plaza at the north end of the bridge was removed.

The final cost was US$1.3 billion, or adjusted for inflation, equivalent to $2.02 billion. The original estimated cost was around $300 million, and later $1.05 billion. It was noted for its large delay in construction and large over cost (over $1 billion). The project's cost overshadowed the replacement of the Cypress Freeway portion of Interstate 880.

The new bridge opened at 10:30pm on August 25, 2007. It was named the Congressman George Miller Benicia–Martinez Bridge after U.S. Congressman George Miller III, Miller Jr.'s son.

== Tolling ==
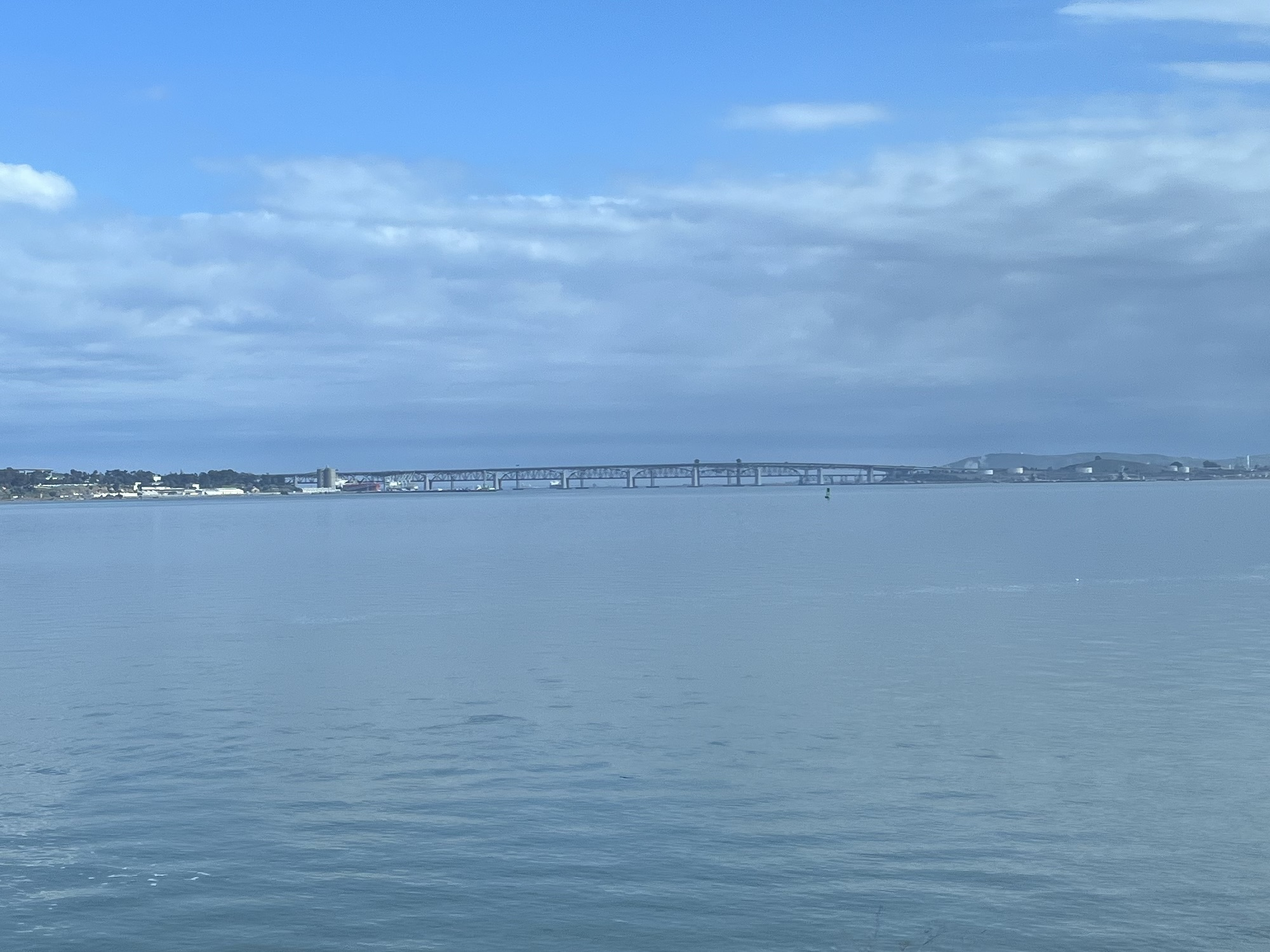
Wide view of the bridge from an approaching Capitol Corridor train in 2025

Tolls are only collected from northbound traffic headed to Benicia at the toll plaza on the Martinez side of the bridge. All-electronic tolling has been in effect since 2020, and drivers may either pay using the FasTrak electronic toll collection device or using the license plate tolling program.

This was the first bridge in California to use an open road tolling system, and the first open road tolling facility in Northern California. The toll plaza has nine lanes with remaining unused toll booths and another nine lanes with open road tolling in two zones: one zone has two travel lanes and four shoulder lanes, and the other zone has one designated carpool travel lane with two shoulder lanes. Until the remaining unused toll booths are removed, drivers in those lanes are forced to slow substantially from freeway speeds while passing through.

Effective January 1 – December 31, 2026, the toll rate for passenger cars is $8.50. During peak traffic hours on weekdays between 5:00 am and 10:00 am, and between 3:00 pm and 7:00 pm, carpool vehicles carrying three or more people or motorcycles may pay a discounted toll of $4.25 if they use the designated carpool lane with a FasTrak Flex transponder with its switch set to indicate the number of the vehicle's occupants (1, 2, or 3+). Two-person carpools may still use the carpool lane but will still be charged the full toll. Drivers without Fastrak or a license plate account must open and pay via a "short term" account within 48 hours after crossing the bridge or they will be sent an invoice of the unpaid toll. No additional toll violation penalty will be assessed if the invoice is paid within 21 days.

=== Historical toll rates ===
When the Benicia–Martinez Bridge opened in 1962, tolls were $0.25 per car (equivalent to $2.66 in 2025). It was set to $0.35 in 1970 (equivalent to $2.9 in 2025), then increased to $0.40 in 1976 (equivalent to $2.26 in 2025).

The basic toll (for automobiles) on the seven state-owned bridges, including the Benicia–Martinez Bridge, was standardized to $1 by Regional Measure 1, approved by Bay Area voters in 1988 (equivalent to $2.72 in 2025). A $1 seismic retrofit surcharge was added in 1998 by the state legislature, increasing the toll to $2 (equivalent to $3.95 in 2025), originally for eight years, but since then extended to December 2037 (AB1171, October 2001). On March 2, 2004, voters approved Regional Measure 2 to fund various transportation improvement projects, raising the toll by another dollar to $3 (equivalent to $5.11 in 2025). An additional dollar was added to the toll starting January 1, 2007, to cover cost overruns on the eastern span replacement of the Bay Bridge, increasing the toll to $4 (equivalent to $6.21 in 2025).

The Metropolitan Transportation Commission (MTC), a regional transportation agency, in its capacity as the Bay Area Toll Authority, administers RM1 and RM2 funds, a significant portion of which are allocated to public transit capital improvements and operating subsidies in the transportation corridors served by the bridges. Caltrans administers the "second dollar" seismic surcharge, and receives some of the MTC-administered funds to perform other maintenance work on the bridges. The state legislature created the Bay Area Toll Authority in 1997 to transfer the toll administration of the seven state-owned bridges to the MTC. The Bay Area Toll Authority is made up of appointed officials put in place by various city and county governments, and is not subject to direct voter oversight.

Due to further funding shortages for seismic retrofit projects, the Bay Area Toll Authority again raised tolls on all seven of the state-owned bridges in July 2010. The toll rate for autos on the Benicia–Martinez Bridge was thus increased to $5 (equivalent to $7.38 in 2025).

In June 2018, Bay Area voters approved Regional Measure 3 to further raise the tolls on all seven of the state-owned bridges to fund $4.5 billion worth of transportation improvements in the area. Under the passed measure, the toll rate for autos on the Benicia–Martinez Bridge was increased to $6 on January 1, 2019; to $7 on January 1, 2022; and then to $8 on January 1, 2025.

In September 2019, the MTC approved a $4 million plan to eliminate toll takers and convert all seven of the state-owned bridges to all-electronic tolling, citing that 80 percent of drivers are now using FasTrak and the change would improve traffic flow. On March 20, 2020, accelerated by the COVID-19 pandemic, all-electronic tolling was placed in effect for all seven state-owned toll bridges. The MTC then installed new systems at all seven bridges to make them permanently cashless by the start of 2021. In April 2022, the Bay Area Toll Authority announced plans to remove all remaining unused toll booths and create an open-road tolling system which functions at highway speeds.

The Bay Area Toll Authority then approved a plan in December 2024 to implement 50-cent annual toll increases on all seven state-owned bridges between 2026 and 2030 to help pay for bridge maintenance. The standard toll rate for autos will thus rise to $8.50 on January 1, 2026; $9 in 2027; $9.50 in 2028; $10 in 2029; and then to $10.50 in 2030. And becoming effective in 2027, a 25-cent surcharge will be added to any toll charged to a license plate account, and a 1 dollar surcharge added to a toll violation invoice, due to the added cost of processing these payment methods.

== See also ==
- California Pacific Railroad
- Carquinez Bridge
