= Half Way to Hell Club =

Informal iron workers group

Letterhead from Half Way to Hell Club.

The Half Way to Hell Club was an exclusive club organized by the men who fell from the Golden Gate Bridge during its construction in 1936 and 1937 and were saved by the safety nets. One of the club's earliest members was iron worker Al Zampa who fell into the safety nets in October 1936.

Al Zampa (1905–2000), as one of the club's first members and presumably the last surviving member, became the unofficial spokesman for the club. According to Zampa, when a man fell to his death from a bridge it was said "he's gone to hell." The men who fell and were saved by the nets were said to have fallen only "half way to hell."

Miles Green, Paul Terry, James Roberts, Jack Miller, Jack Dayle, Edward Stanley (Not pictured are Chamberlain, Murry, Perry, and Zampa who were still in hospital when this picture was taken.)

Zampa goes on: "There were ten of us that fell into the nets those first few weeks. Four got hurt. I was one of them. We were in the hospital together. We formed the club right there in St. Luke's Hospital."

Newspaper accounts sketch out some details and give some of the names of the 19 members who rounded out the club. No complete list of names has been found, and only one photo is known to exist from that time of the early group.

Photographer and bridge historian John V. Robinson listed ten of the nineteen members of the Half Way to Hell club in his 2004 book Spanning the Strait as:

- Miles Green
- Paul Terry
- James Roberts
- Jack Miller
- Jack Dayle
- Edward Stanley
- Ward Chamberlain
- George Murray
- John Perry
- Al Zampa

Robinson writes in his book that no one is really sure what became of the 19 men who fell into the nets. No complete list of names has ever been discovered. Al Zampa, who died in 2000 at the age of 95, may have been the last surviving member of the club, and it is very unlikely that any members are still alive.
