= Carquinez Bridge =

Pair of bridges in the San Francisco Bay, California, US

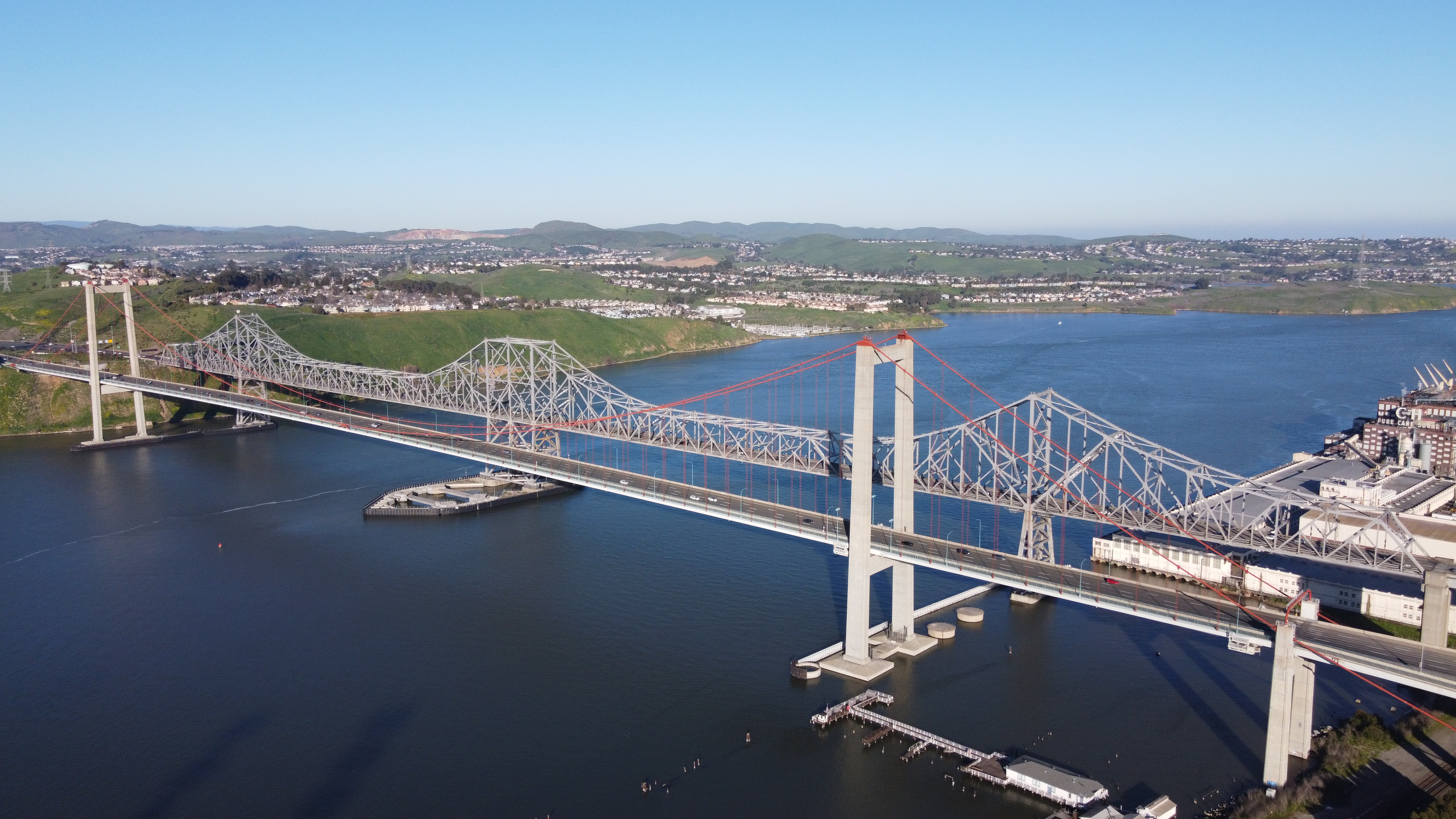
- The Carquinez Bridge in 2022: (from closest to furthest) a 2003 suspension bridge and the 1958 cantilever bridge
- Coordinates: 38°03′39″N 122°13′33″W
- Carries: 8 lanes of I-80; Bicycles and pedestrians on westbound span
- Crosses: Carquinez Strait
- Locale: Crockett and Vallejo, California, U.S.
- Official name: Alfred Zampa Memorial Bridge (suspension bridge only)
- Other name(s): Zampa Bridge, Vallejo Bridge
- Owner: State of California
- Maintained by: California Department of Transportation and the Bay Area Toll Authority
- ID number: 23 0015L (1927 span); 23 0015R (1958 span); 28 0352L (2003 span)

Characteristics
- Design: Cantilever bridge (eastbound); Suspension bridge (westbound)
- Total length: Suspension bridge: 3,465 ft (0.7 mi; 1.1 km); Cantilever bridge: 3,300 ft (0.6 mi; 1.0 km)
- Width: Suspension bridge: 84 ft (26 m); Cantilever bridge: 52 ft (16 m)
- Height: Suspension bridge: 410 ft (120 m)
- Longest span: Suspension bridge: 2,387 ft (728 m)
- Clearance below: Suspension bridge: 148 ft (45 m); Cantilever bridge: 140 ft (43 m)

History
- Opened: Original span: May 21, 1927; Eastbound: November 25, 1958; Westbound: November 11, 2003
- Closed: Original span: September 4, 2007

Statistics
- Toll: Eastbound only; FasTrak or pay-by-plate, cash not accepted; Effective January 1 – December 31, 2026: $8.50; $4.25 (carpool rush hours, FasTrak only)

Location
- Interactive map of Carquinez Bridge

The Carquinez Bridge is a pair of parallel bridges spanning the Carquinez Strait at the northeastern end of San Francisco Bay. They form the part of Interstate 80 between Crockett and Vallejo, California, United States.

The name Carquinez Bridge originally referred to a single cantilever bridge built in 1927, which was part of the direct route between San Francisco and Sacramento. A second parallel cantilever bridge was completed in 1958 to deal with the increased traffic.

Later, seismic problems made the 1927 span unsafe in case of an earthquake, and led to the construction, and 2003 opening, of a replacement: a suspension bridge officially named the Alfred Zampa Memorial Bridge, in memory of iron worker Al Zampa, who played an integral role in the construction of numerous San Francisco Bay Area bridges. The Alfred Zampa Memorial Bridge carries southbound traffic from Vallejo to Crockett, and the 1958 cantilever span carries northbound traffic.

== History and description ==
The first regular crossing of the Carquinez Strait began in the mid-1800s as a ferry operated between the cities of Benicia and Martinez, six miles upstream from the bridge site. Auto service started on this route in 1913. A train ferry operated between Benicia and Port Costa from 1879 until 1930 when a rail bridge opened. Ferry service at the site of the bridge started in 1913 by the Rodeo-Vallejo Ferry Company.

=== Original span (1927–2007) ===
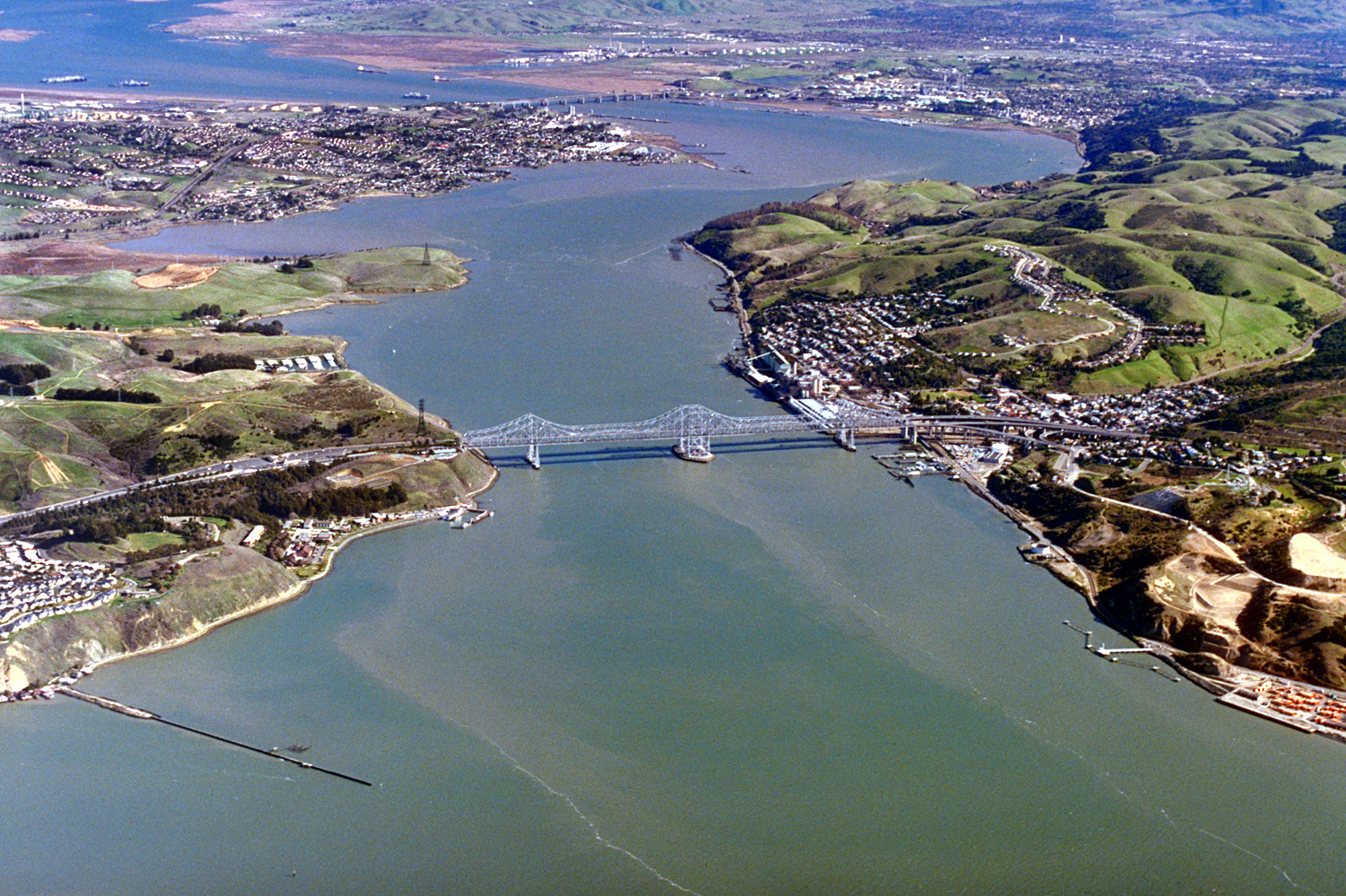
Aerial view of Carquinez Strait and bridges prior to 2007, before construction of the new suspension bridge

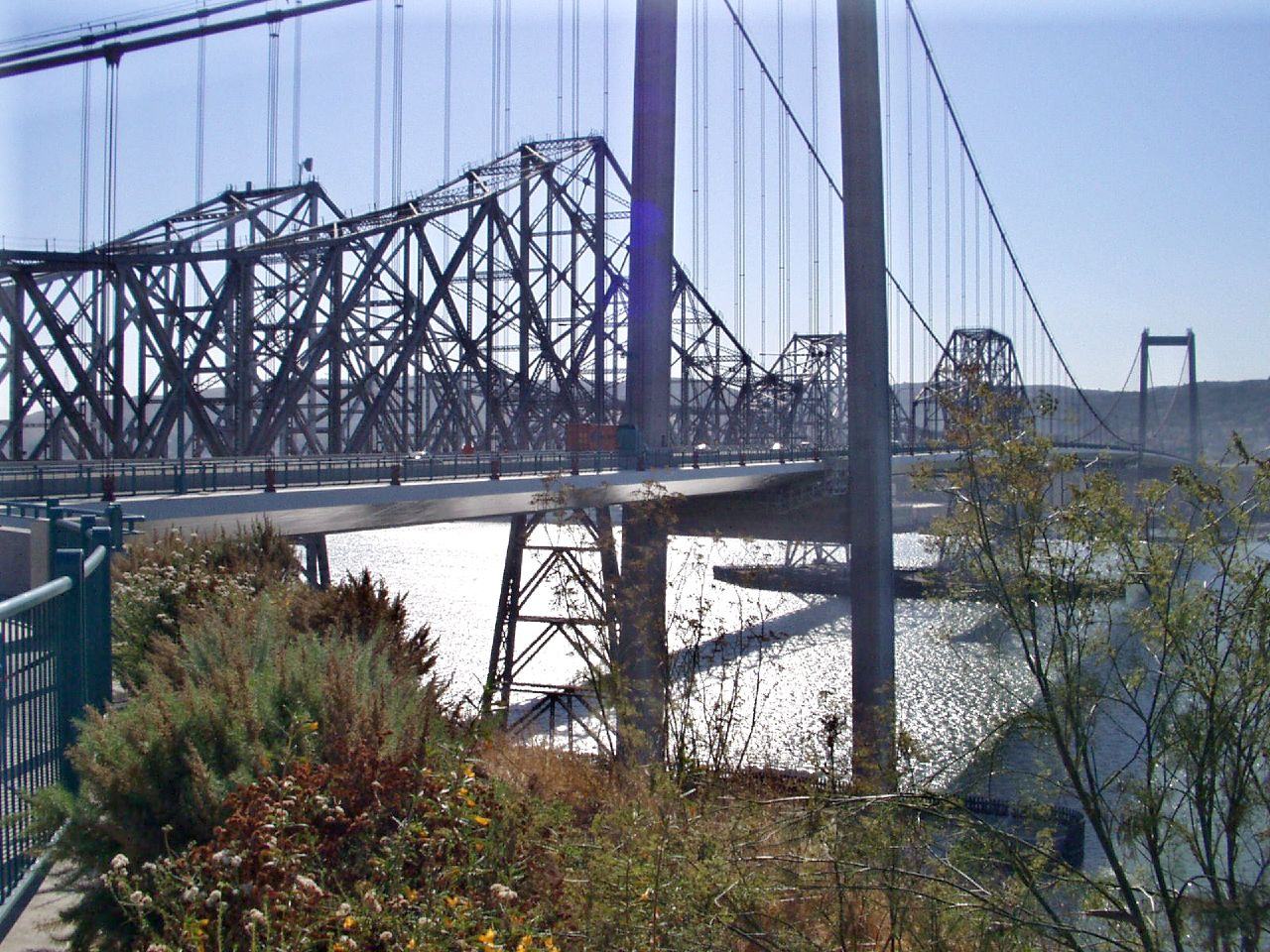
Carquinez Bridge in 2006 with the 1927 span in the center

The original steel cantilever bridge was designed by Robinson & Steinman and dedicated on May 21, 1927. Prior to this, crossing the Carquinez Strait necessitated the use of ferries. The bridge cost $8 million to build (equivalent to $148.28 million in 2025). It was the first major crossing of the San Francisco Bay and a significant technological achievement in its time.

Upon its completion, the span became part of the Lincoln Highway. This historic transcontinental roadway's original alignment, like the Transcontinental Railroad that preceded it nearly sixty years earlier, chose to avoid crossing the Carquinez Strait entirely. The preferred option, given the engineering limitations of the day, was to skirt around the Delta by going south from Sacramento through Stockton, then proceeding west across the San Joaquin River and over the Altamont Pass, and finally reaching Oakland from the south; a route that would later become U.S. Route 50 and ultimately Interstates 5, 205, and 580. This circuitous route, several miles longer, and traversing a rather formidable mountain pass, was preferable to crossing the Carquinez Strait, a deep channel with strong currents and frequent high winds. For decades, building a bridge across the Carquinez Strait was considered prohibitively expensive and technologically risky. Once the bridge was built however, driving from Sacramento to the East Bay became much more direct. The Carquinez Bridge provided a welcome alternative route from the Central Valley to the Bay Area, one that no longer required loading one's vehicle onto and off of a ferry. With the bridge completed, the Lincoln Highway was realigned to cross the Sacramento River, then proceed southwest through Davis and Vallejo, across the Carquinez Bridge, and along the shores of the San Pablo and San Francisco bays to Richmond and Oakland; becoming U.S. Route 40, and ultimately Interstate 80.

After the Loma Prieta earthquake engineers determined that the aging 1927 span was seismically unstable, and that a retrofit was impossible. The decision was made to replace it with a new suspension bridge. After the 2003 replacement span opened, the 1927 span was temporarily used to hold eastbound traffic while the 1958 eastbound span underwent a seismic retrofit, deck and superstructure rehabilitation, and painting to extend its serviceable life. The old 1927 cantilever bridge was dismantled three years after the opening of its replacement; with completion on September 4, 2007. A 3,000-pound bronze bell atop one of the bridge piers was removed and placed into storage. The bell will eventually be displayed in a new museum to be built at the Oakland end of the San Francisco–Oakland Bay Bridge.

=== Parallel span (1958) ===
At a cost of $38 million (equivalent to $424.05 million in 2025), a parallel bridge was built just east of the 1927 bridge. The new bridge carried all traffic for a few months after it opened in November 1958, then after new ramps were built, the three-lane 1927 span, originally two-way, served westbound traffic while the four-lane 1958 span handled eastbound traffic.

=== Alfred Zampa Memorial Bridge (2003 replacement span) ===
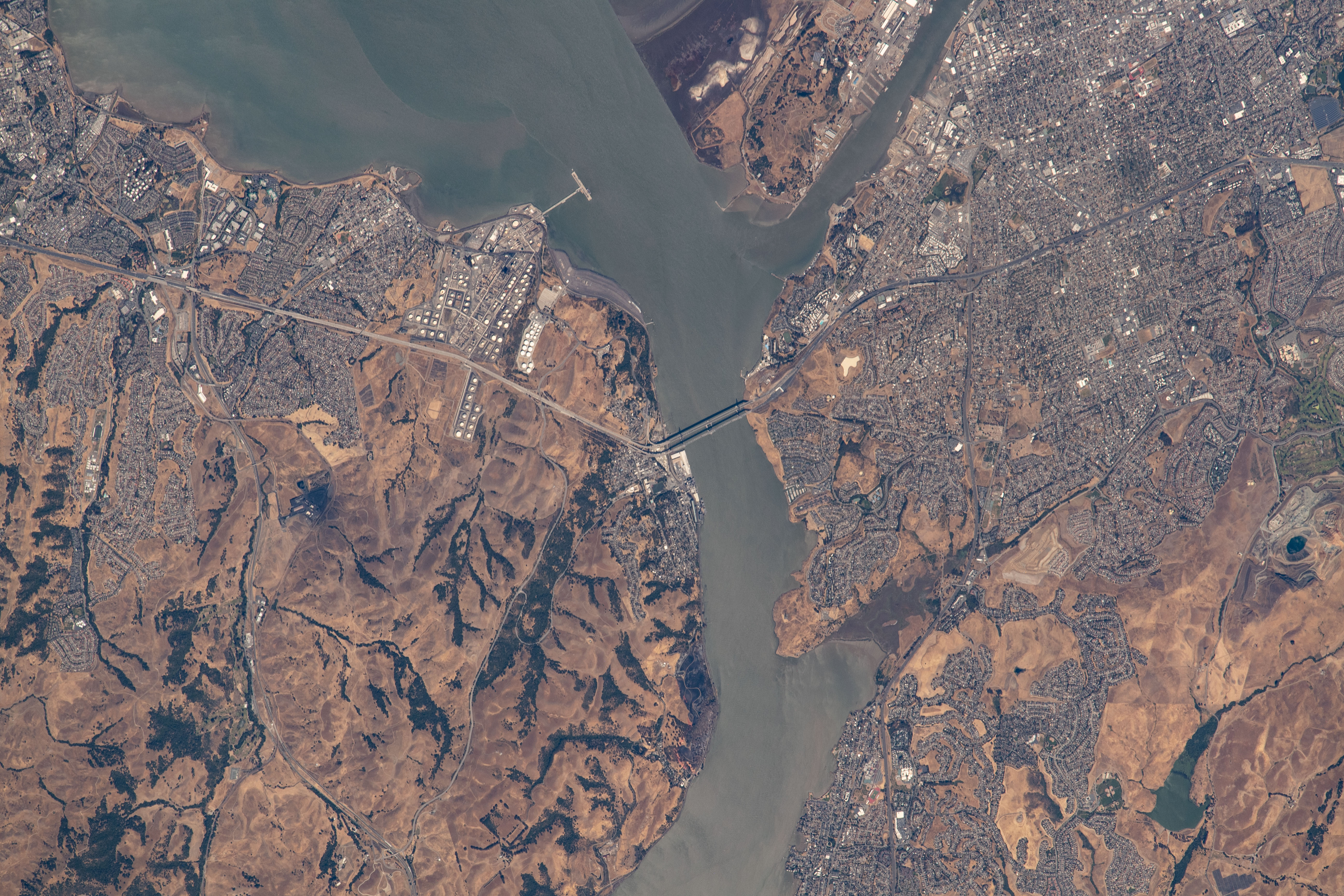
The bridge and vicinity on June 28, 2022, taken from the International Space Station

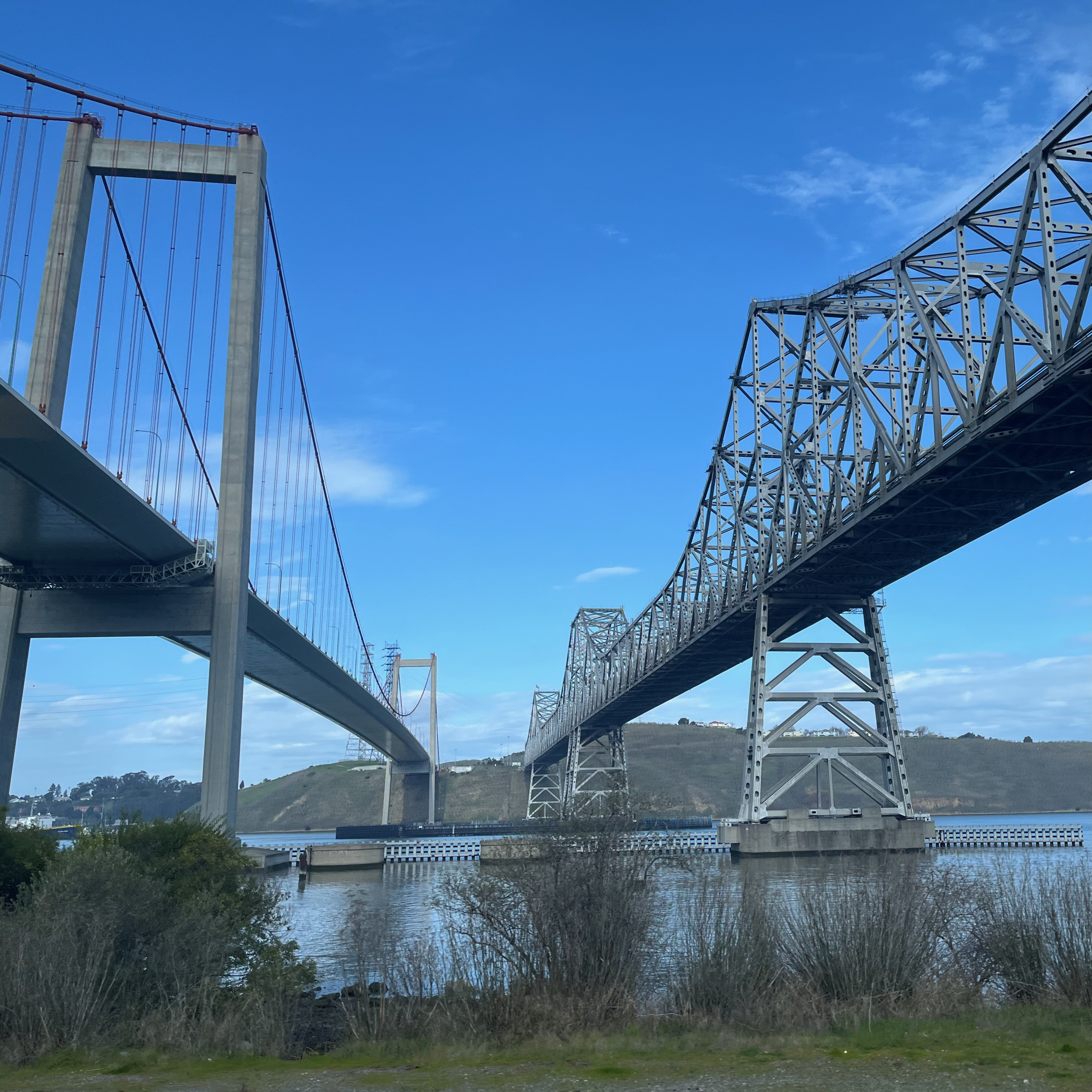
The 2003 and 1958 bridges viewed from a passing Amtrak Capitol Corridor train in 2025

At a cost of $240 million (equivalent to $420.04 million in 2025) a new suspension bridge was built, to the west of the two earlier bridges, by the joint venture consisting of Flatiron Structures of Longmont, Colorado, FCI Constructors of Benicia, California, and the Cleveland Bridge & Engineering Company of Darlington, England.

This new bridge was named the Alfred Zampa Memorial Bridge, after an ironworker who worked on a number of the San Francisco Bay Area bridges, including the Golden Gate Bridge, and the original 1927 Carquinez span. The bridge was dedicated on November 8, 2003, and opened for traffic on November 11, 2003. Originally, the plan was to dedicate the bridge on November 15, but complications involving then just-recalled Governor Gray Davis and the transfer of power to Arnold Schwarzenegger resulted in the date being moved. The coins minted to commemorate the event have the original date on them.

The new suspension bridge, consists of the south anchorage, a transition pier, the South and North towers, and the north anchorage. It has spans of 147 m, 728 m, and 181 m. for a total span of 0.66 miles (1,060 m). It features a pedestrian and bicycle path, part of a bike trail which it is hoped will eventually circle the entire Bay Area. The towers are each founded on two footings, which are each supported by six vertical, 3-metre-diameter (9.8 ft) steel shells infilled with reinforced concrete, followed by 2.7-metre-diameter (8.9 ft) drilled shafts in rock, i.e., cast-in-drilled hole, or CIDH, piles. The total length of the CIDH pile at the South Tower is approximately 89 m, with about 43 m of drilled shaft in rock. The total length of the CIDH pile at the North Tower ranges from 49 to 64 m, with about 16 to 26 m of drilled shaft in rock. The design parameters used for the South Tower piles were later confirmed by a pile load test. Additional field investigations during construction revealed significant variations in rock conditions at the North Tower, resulting in the redesign of the length of the piles. Major construction challenges encountered during construction of the South Tower piles, and the revised construction procedure, i.e., under-reaming, used by the constructor to mitigate caving.

Materials for the New Bridge came from all over the world:

- Steel Caissons for CIDH: XKT Engineering – Vallejo, California
- Orthotropic Deck Sections: IHI – Japan
- Tower and Splay Saddles:
  - Castings: Sheffield Steel – England
  - Finishing and Machining: Kvaerner – England
- Main Cable Wire: Bridon – England
- Wire for Cable Wrapping: Canada
- Cable Bands: France
- Suspenders (Hardware, Casting, Fabrication): WRCA – St. Joseph, Missouri
- (3) Maintenance Travelers Under Deck Sections: Jesse Engineering – Tacoma, Washington

== Tolls ==
Tolls are only collected from eastbound traffic after they cross from Crockett at the toll plaza on the Vallejo side of the bridge. Although the 2003 Alfred Zampa Memorial Bridge is the newer span, no toll is charged in that direction, continuing the practice of the now-demolished 1927 span. All-electronic tolling has been in effect since 2020, and drivers may either pay using the FasTrak electronic toll collection device or using the license plate tolling program. It remains not truly an open road tolling system until the remaining unused toll booths are removed, forcing drivers to slow substantially from freeway speeds while passing through. Effective January 1 – December 31, 2026, the toll rate for passenger cars is $8.50. During peak traffic hours on weekdays between 5:00 am and 10:00 am, and between 3:00 pm and 7:00 pm, carpool vehicles carrying three or more people or motorcycles may pay a discounted toll of $4.25 if they use the designated carpool lane with a FasTrak Flex transponder with its switch set to indicate the number of the vehicle's occupants (1, 2, or 3+). Two-person carpools may still use the carpool lane but will still be charged the full toll. Drivers without Fastrak or a license plate account must open and pay via a "short term" account within 48 hours after crossing the bridge or they will be sent an invoice of the unpaid toll. No additional toll violation penalty will be assessed if the invoice is paid within 21 days.

=== Historical toll rates ===
Crossing the original 1927 bridge required a toll, but tolls were removed within five years after the state bought the bridge in 1940. Tolls in 1926 were originally set at $0.60 per car (equivalent to $10.91 in 2025) plus $0.10 per passenger (equivalent to $1.82 in 2025). This was reduced in 1938 to $0.45 per car (equivalent to $10.29 in 2025) plus $0.05 per passenger (equivalent to $1.14 in 2025). After the state took ownership in 1940, tolls were immediately reduced to $0.30 per car (equivalent to $6.89 in 2025). In 1942, tolls were further reduced to $0.25 (equivalent to $4.93 in 2025) before being removed in 1945. Tolls were reinstated in 1958 with the completion of the parallel span, set again at $0.25 (equivalent to $2.79 in 2025). It was increased to $0.35 in 1970 (equivalent to $2.9 in 2025), and then $0.40 in 1978 (equivalent to $1.97 in 2025).

The basic toll (for automobiles) on the seven state-owned bridges, including the Carquinez Bridge, was standardized to $1 by Regional Measure 1, approved by Bay Area voters in 1988 (equivalent to $2.72 in 2025). A $1 seismic retrofit surcharge was added in 1998 by the state legislature, increasing the toll to $2 (equivalent to $3.95 in 2025), originally for eight years, but since then extended to December 2037 (AB1171, October 2001). On March 2, 2004, voters approved Regional Measure 2 to fund various transportation improvement projects, raising the toll by another dollar to $3 (equivalent to $5.11 in 2025). An additional dollar was added to the toll starting January 1, 2007, to cover cost overruns on the eastern span replacement of the Bay Bridge, increasing the toll to $4 (equivalent to $6.21 in 2025).

The Metropolitan Transportation Commission (MTC), a regional transportation agency, in its capacity as the Bay Area Toll Authority, administers RM1 and RM2 funds, a significant portion of which are allocated to public transit capital improvements and operating subsidies in the transportation corridors served by the bridges. Caltrans administers the "second dollar" seismic surcharge, and receives some of the MTC-administered funds to perform other maintenance work on the bridges. The state legislature created the Bay Area Toll Authority in 1997 to transfer the toll administration of the seven state-owned bridges to the MTC. The Bay Area Toll Authority is made up of appointed officials put in place by various city and county governments, and is not subject to direct voter oversight.

Due to further funding shortages for seismic retrofit projects, the Bay Area Toll Authority again raised tolls on all seven of the state-owned bridges in July 2010. The toll rate for autos on the Carquinez Bridge was thus increased to $5 (equivalent to $7.38 in 2025).

In June 2018, Bay Area voters approved Regional Measure 3 to further raise the tolls on all seven of the state-owned bridges to fund $4.5 billion worth of transportation improvements in the area. Under the passed measure, the toll rate for autos on the Carquinez Bridge was increased to $6 on January 1, 2019; to $7 on January 1, 2022; and then to $8 on January 1, 2025.

In September 2019, the MTC approved a $4 million plan to eliminate toll takers and convert all seven of the state-owned bridges to all-electronic tolling, citing that 80 percent of drivers are now using FasTrak and the change would improve traffic flow. On March 20, 2020, accelerated by the COVID-19 pandemic, all-electronic tolling was placed in effect for all seven state-owned toll bridges. The MTC then installed new systems at all seven bridges to make them permanently cashless by the start of 2021. In April 2022, the Bay Area Toll Authority announced plans to remove all remaining unused toll booths and create an open-road tolling system which functions at highway speeds.

The Bay Area Toll Authority then approved a plan in December 2024 to implement 50-cent annual toll increases on all seven state-owned bridges between 2026 and 2030 to help pay for bridge maintenance. The standard toll rate for autos will thus rise to $8.50 on January 1, 2026; $9 in 2027; $9.50 in 2028; $10 in 2029; and then to $10.50 in 2030. And becoming effective in 2027, a 25-cent surcharge will be added to any toll charged to a license plate account, and a 50-cent surcharge added to a toll violation invoice, due to the added cost of processing these payment methods.

== In popular culture ==
- The 1927 span of the Carquinez Bridge is featured on a Season 4 episode of MythBusters in the Miniature Earthquake Machine segment. This experiment, based upon a claim by inventor Nikola Tesla that his mechanical oscillator produced an earthquake in 1898, employed a small tunable reciprocating mass driver to shake the bridge at its resonance frequency. While not structurally significant, the shaking was felt some distance from the driver.
- An hour-length program, titled Break It Down: "Bridge", documenting the demolition of the 1927 bridge aired on National Geographic Channel, on November 1, 2007
- On October 5, 2007, a man jumped off the new 156-foot-high (48 m) bridge. The Coast Guard, Vallejo Police, and Fire responded to find him on the breakwater. He survived the fall.
- Four books have been published about, or featuring, the Carquinez Bridges:Spanning the Carquinez Strait: The Alfred Zampa Memorial Bridge (2003) by Caltrans, and Spanning the Strait: Building the Alfred Zampa Memorial Bridge (2004), Al Zampa and the Bay Area Bridges (2005), and, most recently, Carquinez Bridge: 1927-2007 (2017) all by John V. Robinson.
- The bridge is depicted in the 2017 Netflix TV series 13 Reasons Why.
- The bridge is depicted in the 2016 Czech computer game American Truck Simulator.

== See also ==
- Benicia–Martinez Bridge
- List of bridges documented by the Historic American Engineering Record in California
