= Lucy Dunn =

American lawyer

Lucetta "Lucy" Dunn
- Occupations: Orange County Business Council CEO & President

Lucetta "Lucy" Dunn is an American attorney and business leader in Orange County, California. She was the president and CEO of Orange County Business Council (OCBC).

== Career ==
Lucy Dunn graduated from California State University, Fullerton in 1976 and Western State University College of Law in 1981.

From 1981–87, she managed her own private practice. In 1987, she joined Signal Landmark as vice president and assistant general counsel, and later moved in 1990 into the role of vice president of development and project management for Bolsa Chica.

Dunn was appointed by Governor Arnold Schwarzenegger in 2004 to serve as Director of the California Department of Housing and Community Development. Dunn was appointed president and CEO of the Orange County Business Council in 2005. In June 2008, Governor Schwarzenegger appointed her to the California Transportation Commission and in March 2012, Governor Jerry Brown appointed her to serve a second term. In 2012, she was appointed by the Ontario City Council to the board of the newly created Ontario International Airport Authority.

She is a former secretary of the California Building Industry Association, former director of the National Association of Home Builders and a former member of the Urban Land Institute.

Dunn is a director of a number of nonprofit organizations including Pacific Symphony, the Lennar Charitable Housing Foundation, and a founder of the Bolsa Chica Conservancy.

In December 2021, Dunn stepped down as president of OCBC after announcing her retirement earlier that year.
