= California Highway Commission =

The California Highway Commission was established in 1895 and continued until 1978 as the primary California government agency responsible for state highway planning. It exercised jurisdiction over the California state highway system, especially highway routes, while the Department of Highways, established in 1896, constructed and maintained state highways. The latter agency evolved into the Department of Engineering (1907), the Department of Public Works (1921), and then the modern California Department of Transportation (1973).

The commission's first noticeable efforts centered on the Lake Tahoe Wagon Road (eventually to become U.S. Route 50) over the Sierra Nevada. A series of municipal bond issues beginning in 1910 allowed the Highway Commission to grade and pave as much of the new state highway system as quickly as possible.

A 1933 statute read in part:

The California highway commission shall have jurisdiction and authority as provided in this section with respect to any state highway lying within any municipality as specifically described by law, also with respect to a state highway, the natural course of which runs or passes into or through any municipality or contiguous municipalities. Unless any such route or routes within a municipality is specifically described by law it shall be the duty of the highway commission to designate and to determine the location of connecting portions either through or around the municipality as the commission may determine will be of the greatest benefit to through traffic and the said commission shall determine such connecting portions with respect to all state highways, the natural course of which runs or passes into or through any municipality.

In 1978, the California Transportation Commission (CTC) replaced and assumed the responsibilities of four independent bodies: The California Highway Commission, the State Transportation Board, the State Aeronautics Board, and the California Toll Bridge Authority.

== See also ==
- History of California's state highway system
