= Bay Bridge Troll =

Statue on the San Francisco Bay Bridge

Coordinates: 37°48′52.6″N 122°21′36.5″W

Bay Bridge Troll. Cal-Trans Media Photo

The Bay Bridge Troll is an 18-inch steel figure that was welded to the eastern span of the original San Francisco Bay Bridge. It was replaced by a newer version in 2013 once the construction of the new Bay Bridge was complete. The creator of the original troll, Bill Roan, is a blacksmith turned artist who lived near the Bay Bridge.

== History ==
In 1989, a section of the Bay Bridge collapsed during the Loma-Prieta earthquake that rocked the San Francisco Bay Area. The bridge was closed for several weeks while repairs were made. When the repairs to the bridge were nearly complete, ironworkers smuggled the small metal troll onto the bridge and welded it permanently to a steel beam on the north side of the bridge. This unusual topping out ceremony became the subject of much curiosity and rumor around the Bay Area. John V. Robinson cites the Bay Bridge troll as an example of a custom being adapted to an unusual circumstance.

The troll first came to the public's attention on January 15, 1990, when the San Francisco Chronicle ran a story about the small figure of a troll complete with a spud wrench that had been welded to the iron below the road on the north side of the bridge. The article quotes official spokesman for the state Department of Transportation, Greg Bayol, as saying, "If we were asked, we would have said 'no,' I'm sure." The iron workers had never asked to put the troll on the bridge, so the state is stuck with the troll.

The troll was placed where motorists on the bridge would never see it. It was on the north side of the outside rail, where only maintenance workers and ironworkers ever venture.

When the troll was made, the contractor, Rigging International, ordered another, now mounted on a damaged section of the old bridge on display in the lobby of their Alameda office.

In August 2013, a white paper was published to the Bay Bridge's website, advocating the troll and the entire section of the span on which it resides be preserved.

In 2002, a new eastern span of the Bay Bridge began construction. The new span opened on Labor Day 2013, and the troll was removed from the old span by ironworkers two days prior on August 30. The troll was on display at the Oakland Museum of California from November 6, 2013, through February 26, 2014. During this time Caltrans considered whether to retire the troll to a museum or attach it to the tower of the new bridge.

On December 23, 2013, an article in SFGate stated that a new, sleeker troll carrying a sledgehammer had been created. The article suggested that the new troll was either living temporarily in a secret location or was already installed on the new bridge.

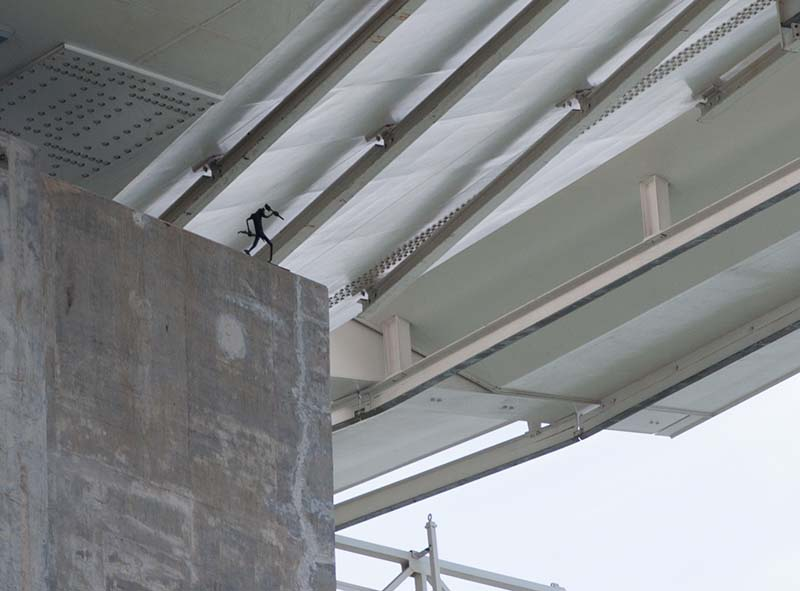
the current troll, click to enlarge

On May 13, 2014, an article on SFGate Blog announced that the new troll has officially been placed on the eastern span of the Bay Bridge. It was said to have been installed overnight, as it is averse to sunlight. "The new troll emerged from hiding Friday and quietly moved in, settling on Pier E2." The troll was placed below the roadway out of sight of motorists; however, it can be seen from a pedestrian walkway. In March 2018 John V. Robinson published a book titled The Oakland-San Francisco Bay Bridge Troll which documents the creation and removal of the old troll as well as the creation of the new troll on the new Bay Bridge.

== See also ==
- Builders' rites
- YouTube video showing new location of the troll
