= California Transportation Commission =

Government agency

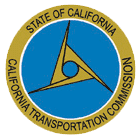

Commission overview
- Formed: 1978; 47 years ago
- Preceding agencies: California Highway Commission; State Transportation Board; State Aeronautics Board; California Toll Bridge Authority
- Jurisdiction: California
- Headquarters: 1120 N Street, Sacramento, California; 38.574564°N 121.493660°W
- Commission executives: Hilary Norton, Chair; Mitch Weiss, Executive Director
- Parent agency: California State Transportation Agency
- Key document: Ch. 1106, Stats. 1977 (CA)
- Website: catc.ca.gov

The California Transportation Commission (CTC) is an independent government transportation commission established in 1978. The CTC replaced and assumed the responsibilities of four prior independent agencies, the California Highway Commission, the State Transportation Board, the State Aeronautics Board, and the California Toll Bridge Authority. The CTC is headquartered in Sacramento.

== Mission ==
The CTC mission statement, adopted May 19, 2010, is as follows:

The California Transportation Commission is an independent public agency dedicated to ensuring a safe, financially sustainable, world-class multimodal transportation system that reduces congestion, improves the environment, and facilitates economic development through the efficient movement of people and goods.

The CTC is responsible for many aspects of transportation planning, funding, and management. The primary responsibilities of the CTC include:

- Programs and allocates federal and state funds for the construction of highway, passenger rail, transit, bicycle, pedestrian, aeronautics, and environmental enhancement mitigation improvements throughout California.
- Adopts estimates of funding expected to be available for various transportation programs.
- Adopts guidelines for the development of CTC administered programs as well as state and regional transportation plans.
- Advises and assists the California State Transportation Agency and the Legislature in formulating and evaluating state policies and plans for transportation issues in California.
- Actively participates in the initiation and development of state and federal legislation in matters concerning transportation issues in California.

== Organizational Structure ==
The CTC consists of 11 voting commissioners and two non-voting ex officio members. Of the 11 voting commissioners, nine are appointed by the Governor, one is appointed by the Senate Rules Committee, and one is appointed by the Speaker of the Assembly. As of August 2017, the chair is Bob Alvarado and the vice chair is Fran Inman. Other commissioners include Yvonne B. Burke, Lucetta Dunn, James Earp, James C. Ghielmetti, Carl Guardino, Christine Kehoe, James Madaffer, Joseph Tavaglione, and Paul Van Konynenburg. The two ex officio non-voting members are appointed from the State Senate and State Assembly. The current ex officio members are Senator Jim Beall and Assembly Member Jim Frazier. The executive director is Susan Bransen.

== History ==
In 2024, the CTC's authorization for the widening of Interstate 15 sparked controversy over its environmental impact. The Environmental Protection Agency investigated allegations that the CTC misled the EPA about the potential environmental impact of the project.

== See also ==
- California Department of Transportation
