= Al Zampa =

American iron worker (1905–2000)

Al Zampa in 1985

Alfred Zampa (March 12, 1905 – April 23, 2000) was an American iron worker who played a role in the construction of numerous San Francisco Bay Area bridges during the early twentieth century. He was most notable for being one of the first people to survive falling off the Golden Gate Bridge. He was a charter member of the Half Way to Hell Club, whose members are the men who fell from the Golden Gate Bridge and were saved by the nets.

== Life and career ==
Zampa was born in Selby, California. He retired from the position of iron worker at the age of 65 in 1970, and died at the age of 95 in Tormey, California. Zampa's parents were born in Ortucchio, a village in the Italian region of Abruzzo; there is now a square in the village named Piazza Alfred Zampa in his honor.

== Cultural influence ==
In 1987 writer Isabelle Maynard wrote and produced a play titled "The Ace" chronicling Zampa's exploits on the Golden Gate Bridge and the formation of the Half Way to Hell Club. "The Ace" was based on Zampa's life and was advertised as an "iron worker's story of heroism, risk and recognition on the Golden Gate Bridge." It was well-received on San Francisco stages, especially during the bridge's 50th anniversary year. The Alfred Zampa Memorial Bridge is named in his honor. The new bridge replaced the 1927 span of the Carquinez Bridge which Zampa helped construct, beginning at the age of 20.
