= Metropolitan Transportation Commission (San Francisco Bay Area) =

San Francisco region transportation planning agency

Metropolitan Transportation Commission (MTC)

Agency overview
- Formed: 1970
- Jurisdiction: San Francisco Bay Area
- Headquarters: Bay Area Metro Center, 375 Beale St, San Francisco, California 94105
- Employees: 289
- Annual budget: $1.36 billion (2019)
- Agency executive: Andrew B. Fremier, Executive Director
- Child agencies: Bay Area Toll Authority; Service Authority for Freeways & Expressways
- Website: mtc.ca.gov

The Metropolitan Transportation Commission (MTC) is the government agency responsible for regional transportation planning and financing in the San Francisco Bay Area. It was created in 1970 by the State of California, with support from the Bay Area Council, to coordinate transportation services in the Bay Area's nine counties: Alameda, Contra Costa, Marin, Napa, San Francisco, San Mateo, Santa Clara, Solano, and Sonoma. The MTC is fourth most populous metropolitan planning organization in the United States.

== Duties ==
MTC is designated a regional transportation planning agency (RTPA) by the State of California and a metropolitan planning organization (MPO) by the federal government. MTC is not the Bay Area's council of governments (COG); the Association of Bay Area Governments (ABAG) holds that role.

MTC administers state-provided money through the Transportation Development Act (TDA) and has decision-making authority over the State Transportation Improvement Program (STIP). MTC administers federal funding through various grant programs, including the Transportation for Livable Communities (TLC) Program, Low Income Flexible Transportation (LIFT) Program, and Innovative Climate Grants Program.

MTC has overseen administration of toll revenue collected on the eight State-owned bridges in the Bay Area through the Bay Area Toll Authority (BATA) since 2005. From 1997 through 2004, BATA administered only a portion of the toll revenue.

Since 1999, MTC has worked to implement a regional transit fare-collection system called Clipper (formerly TransLink), where transit riders use a single card to pay fares on the region's different transit systems.

MTC manages various regional operational programs, including 511, the Freeway Service Patrol (FSP), call boxes, ridesharing, FasTrak electronic toll collection, regional pavement management (including the pavement management system software StreetSaver), arterial operations, and regional signal timing programs.

MTC operates a library that jointly supports MTC and ABAG. The library, which is open to the public, has a collection covering transportation and planning issues for the Bay Area.

== Budget ==
MTC's annual budget in 2019 was $1.36 billion. The MTC collected $724.9 million in toll revenue in 2019. The MTC received $372 million in grants from the state and federal government and sales tax.

At the end of 2019, MTC had $3.5 billion in cash.

== Projects ==
=== Clipper START ===
In July 2020, MTC, in partnership with Muni, Caltrain, Golden Gate Transit, and BART, launched an 18 month pilot program to offer discount of 50% (20% for BART) for Bay Area residents at 200% of the region's federal poverty level. In October 2020, among the covid-19 pandemic, MTC voted to expand to up to 17 more transit agencies. In January 2024, VTA joined the program, expanding it to include 23 Bay Area transit operators, and the program increased the discount to a uniform 50% on all operators.

MTC subsidizes 50% of the discount, the rest is paid by the agencies. In December 2023, there were 26,700 START enrollees and, in 2024 the number increased to 47,200. By February 2025, more than six million total trips were taken via the START program.

== Governing structure ==
MTC is guided by a 21-member board of commissioners:

- Sixteen commissioners are appointed by local elected officials.
  - The five most populous counties have two representatives each: The respective counties' board of supervisors select one representative, and the mayors of the cities within the respective counties appoint the other.
  - The Mayor of Oakland and the Mayor of San Jose each appoint a commissioner
  - The four remaining counties appoint one commissioner each, with the commissioners representing both the cities and the board of supervisors for their respective counties.
- Two members represent regional agencies: ABAG and the Bay Conservation and Development Commission.
- Three non-voting members are appointed to represent the federal housing department and federal and state transportation agencies.

MTC is headquartered in San Francisco and has approximately 289 employees. In July 2016, the ABAG board approved the consolidation of its staff under MTC, combining the work of the Bay Area's two primary regional planning agencies. The current Chair of the Metropolitan Transportation Commission is Napa County Supervisor Alfredo Pedroza

== See also ==
- AC Transit
- BART
- Caltrain
- Golden Gate Transit
- Muni
- SamTrans
- VTA
