= Echelon formation =

Formation with units arranged diagonally

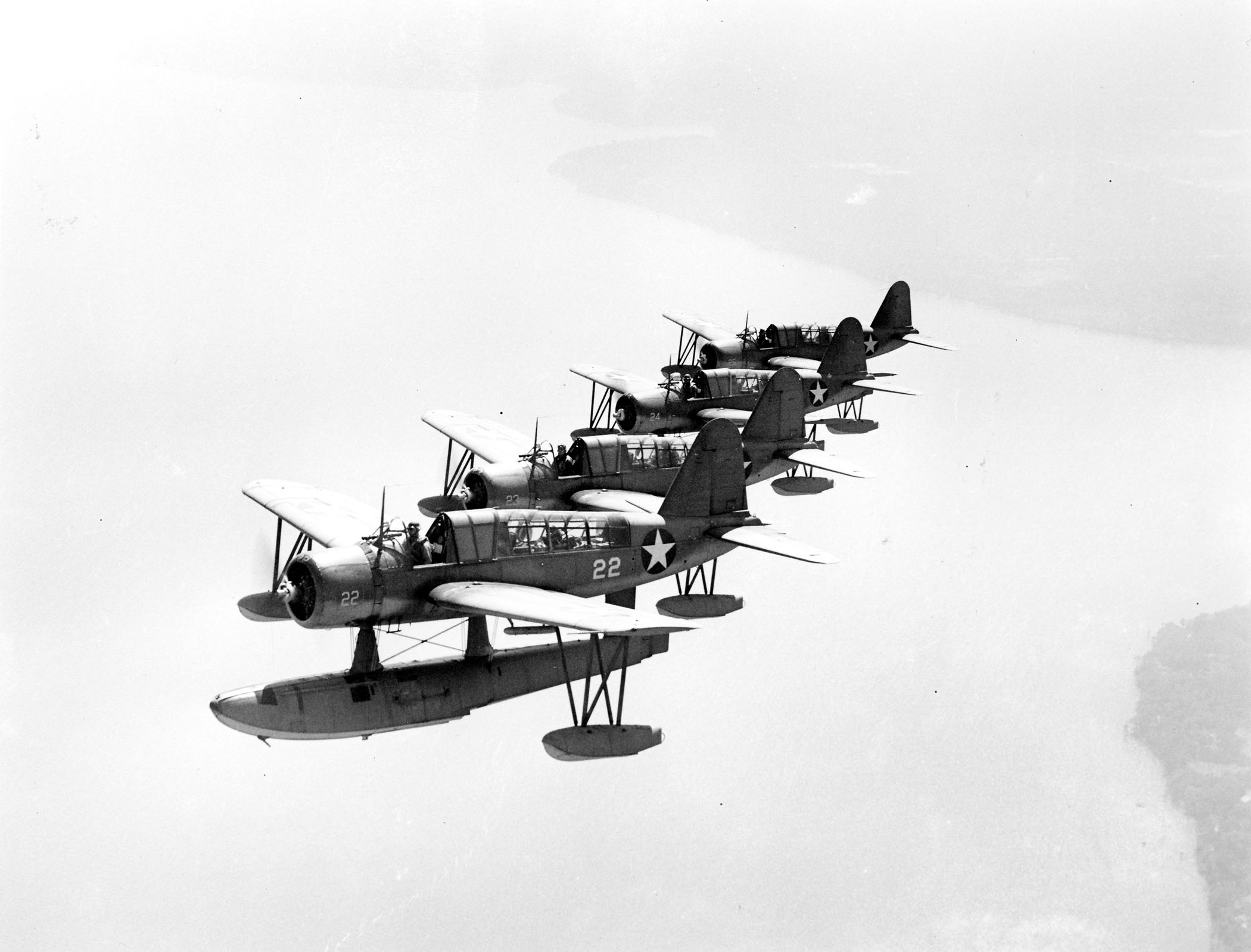
Four OS2U Kingfisher airplanes flying in right echelon formation.

An echelon formation (/ˈɛʃəlɒn, ˈeɪʃlɒ̃/) is a (usually military) formation in which its units are arranged diagonally. Each unit is stationed behind and to the right (a "right echelon"), or behind and to the left ("left echelon"), of the unit ahead. The name of the formation comes from the French word échelon, meaning a rung of a ladder, which describes the shape that this formation has when viewed from above or below.

== Military formation ==
Use of the formation dates back to ancient infantry and cavalry warfare, as an alternative to column, line-abreast, or phalanx (box) formations. One of its earliest uses was at the Battle of Leuctra, when the Thebans attacked the Spartan right with a column 48 men deep while their weaker center and right were repelled. The echelon formation may have been used by Hannibal at the Battle of Cannae, Alexander the Great at the Battle of Gaugamela, Frederick II of Prussia, and the Confederate army at the Battle of Gettysburg.

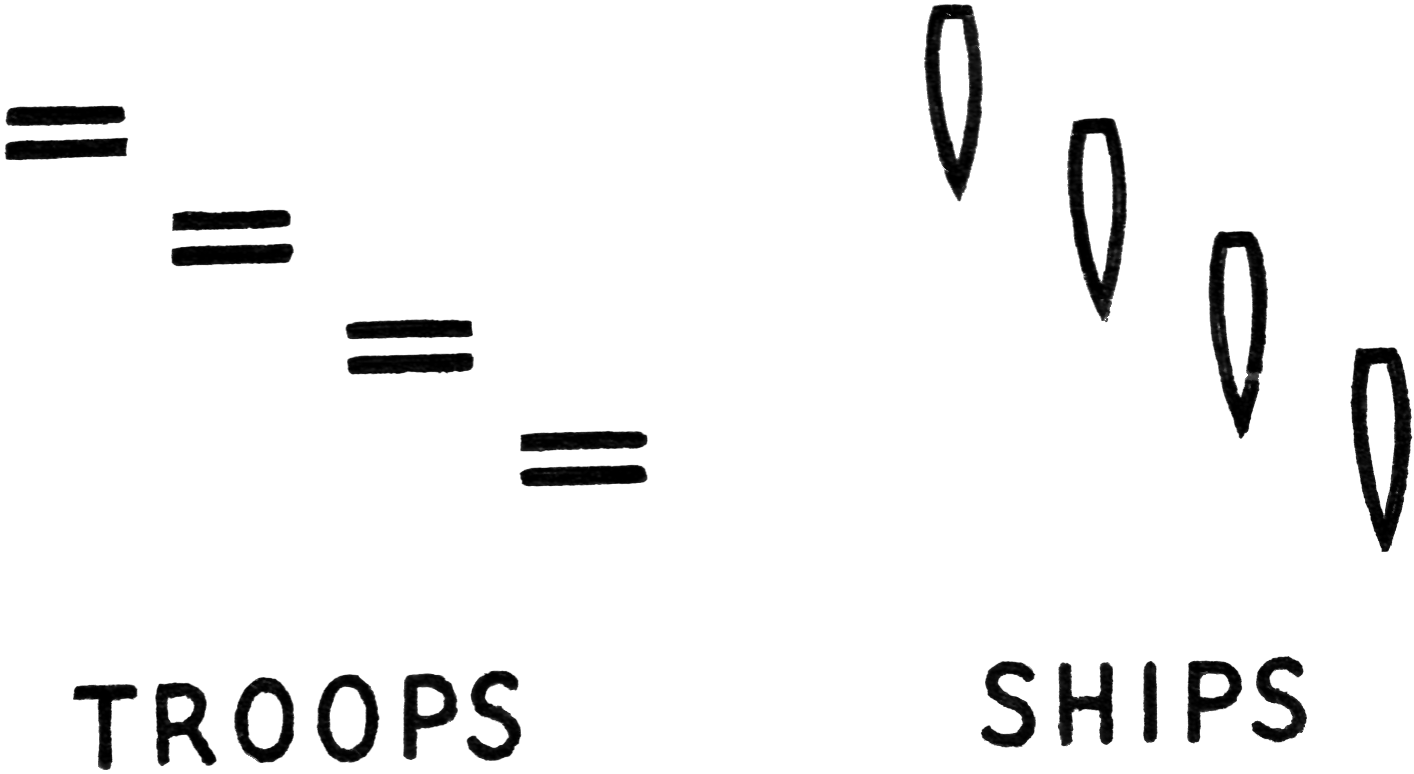
Echelon formations of troops and ships

The tactic still persists and is regularly employed by all branches of the modern armed forces. Tactically, echelon formations are used because of the excellent range of vision offered to each participant in the formation. In particular, it is commonly employed by armored cavalry because of the large, overlapping fields of fire that it gives to each tank in the formation, and by combat aircraft, allowing them to communicate visually and maneuver as a single unit.

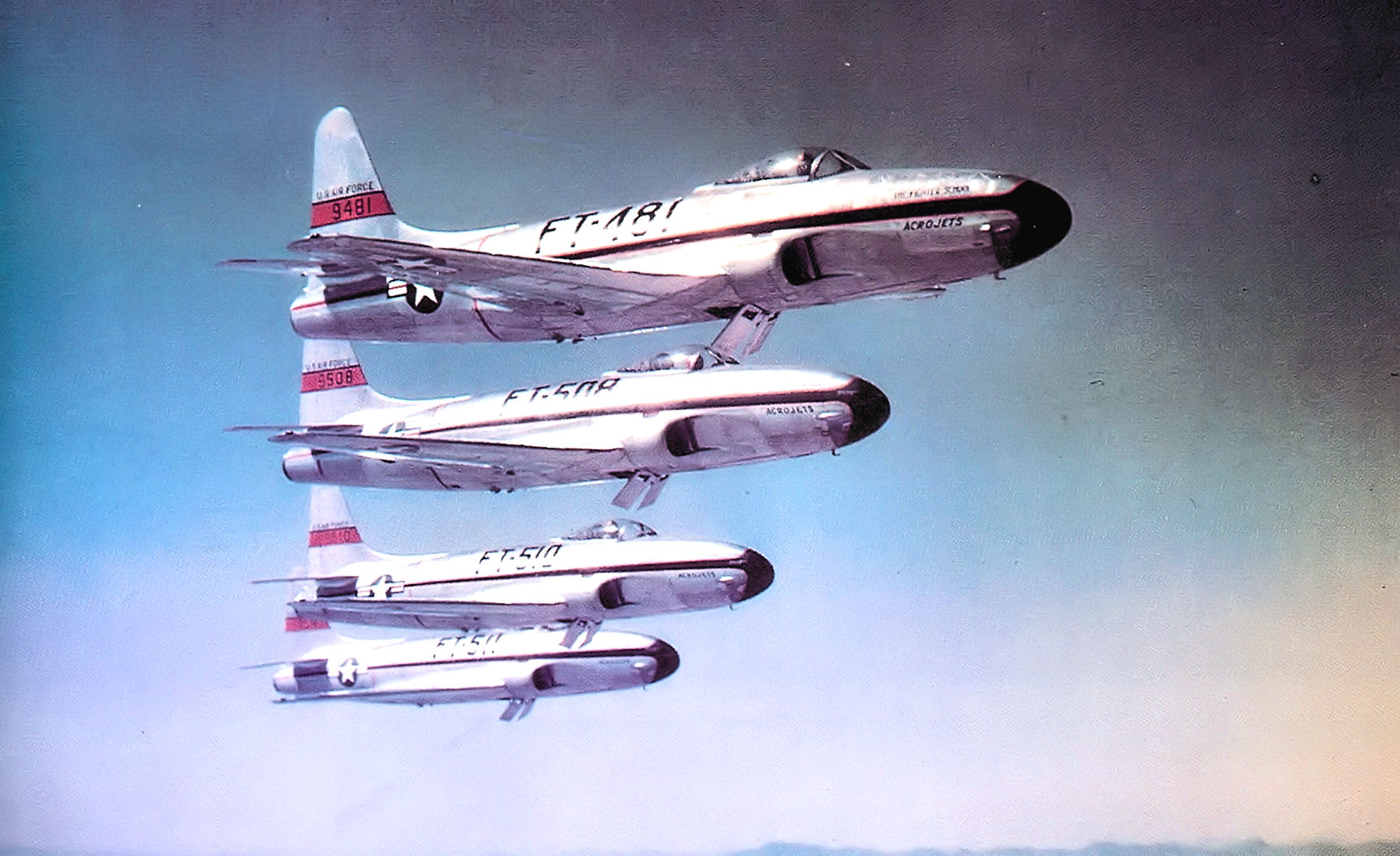
Four Lockheed F-80 aircraft in left echelon formation

"Echeloning" is the name of a tactic in use by the United Kingdom's armed forces, mainly the infantry. It consists of using a company to attack a set of positions. Once the first platoon in the company has reached its limit of advance (ammunition has been expended, fatigue has become high, or casualties are mounting) another platoon "echelons through" it to continue onto the next position. The tactic is similar to leapfrogging.

Echelon formations are also commonly used by civic or riot police to move crowds either to the left or right. En echelon is also used for a type of arrangement of gun turrets on ships: see Glossary of nautical terms § E.

The term "rear echelon" is sometimes used informally and pejoratively to describe rear units that perform logistic and management tasks, far from the front line.

== Derived meanings ==
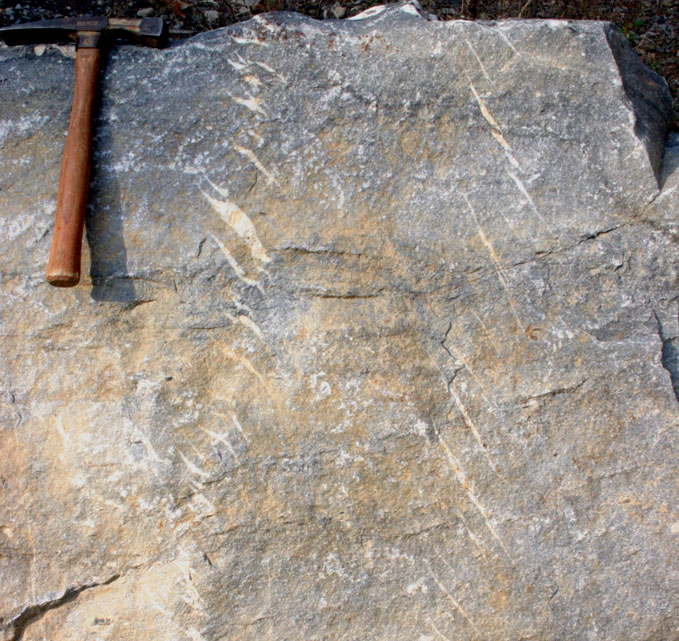
Two parallel sets of en echelon veins in sandstone.

The name has been adopted by the birdwatching community to describe the familiar V-shaped formations of flights of geese, ducks and other migratory birds, though this more symmetric formation is more strictly defined as V formation.

In geology, en echelon describes an arrangement where a set of short linear features overlap or are staggered in a line that runs obliquely to the strike of the individual features. Echelon faults and en echelon veins are examples.

In sheet material response to shear stress it is typical for a series of echelon cracks to form. This is commonly seen in asphalt roads subject to shear stress imposed by aseismic fault creep.

In mathematics, the term row echelon form refers to a kind of matrix where the non-zero elements are shaped in an echelon-like manner.

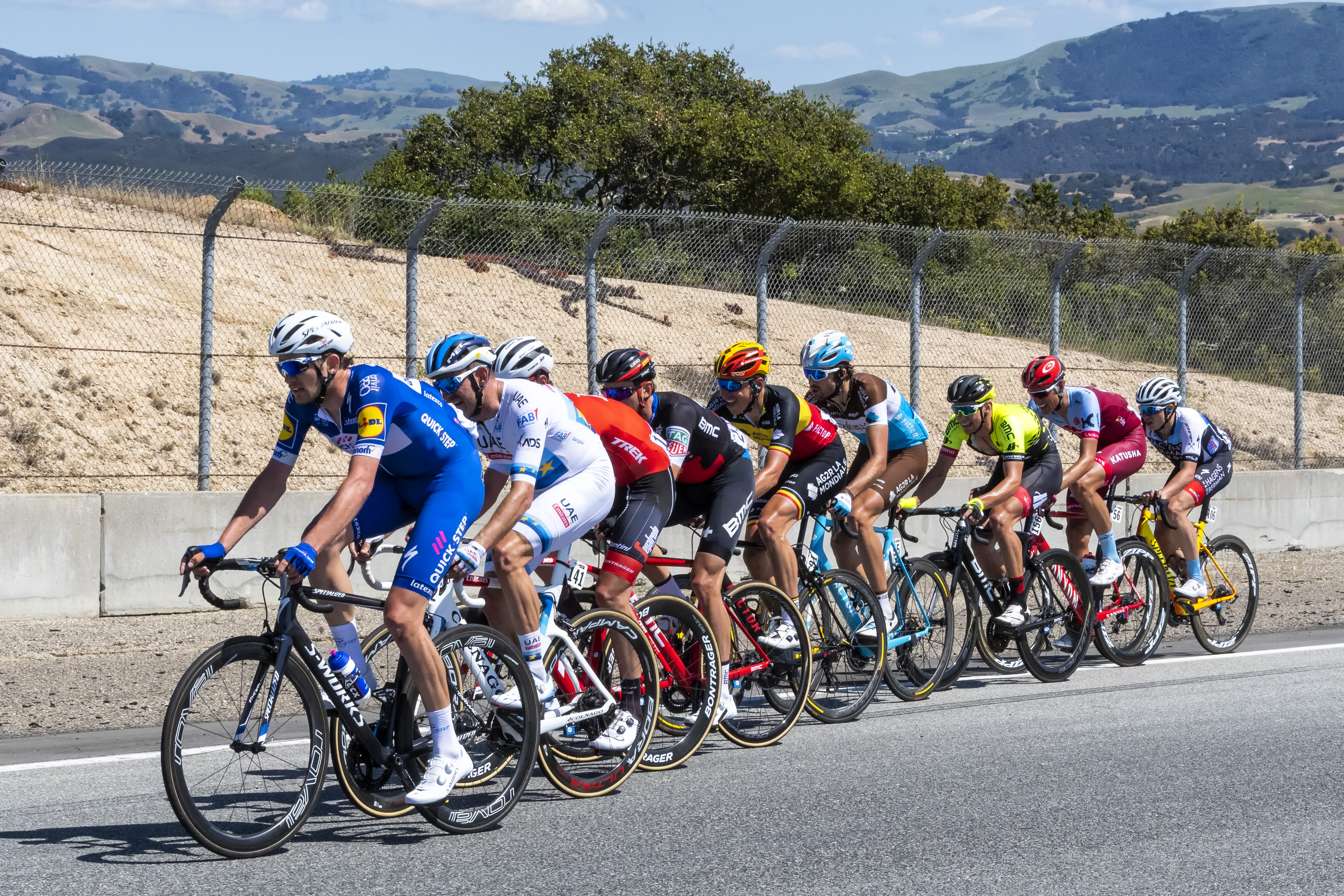
Echelon

In road bicycle racing, an echelon formation is a diagonal line of racers, which allows cooperative drafting in crosswinds.
