= List of ship directions =

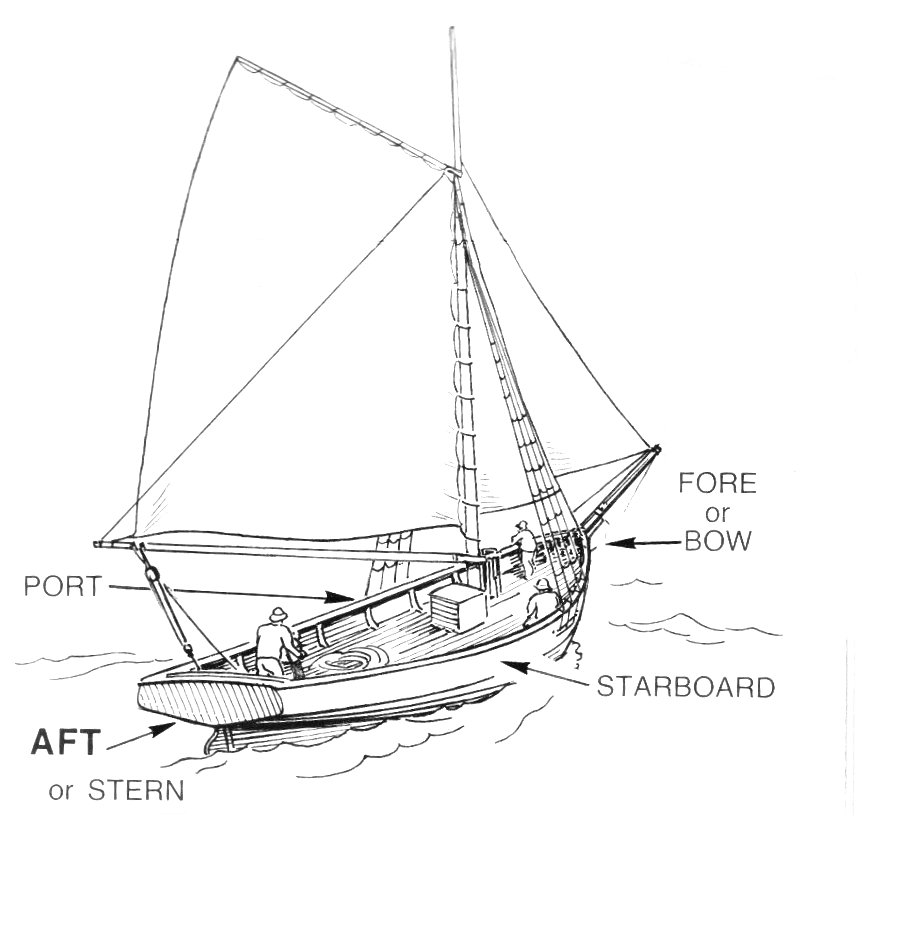
Aft

This list of ship directions provides succinct definitions for terms applying to spatial orientation in a marine environment or location on a vessel, such as fore, aft, astern, aboard, or topside.

== Terms ==
- Abaft (preposition): at or toward the stern of a ship, or further back from a location, e.g. "the mizzenmast is abaft the mainmast".
- Aboard: onto or within a ship, or in a group.
- Above: a higher deck of the ship.
- Aft: toward or at the stern. To the purist, this is an adverb (e.g. "he walked aft"), with the adjective being "after" (e.g. "the after mooring cleat"), but that distinction is becoming blurred in some modern usage.
- Adrift: floating in the water without propulsion.
- Aground: resting on the shore or wedged against the sea floor.
- Ahull: with sails furled and helm lashed alee.
- Alee: on or toward the lee (the downwind side).
- Aloft: the stacks, masts, rigging, or other area above the highest solid structure.
- Amidships: near the middle part of a ship.
- Aport: toward the port side of a ship (opposite of "astarboard").
- Ashore: on or toward the shore or land.
- Astarboard: toward the starboard side of a ship (opposite of "aport").
- Astern (adjective): toward the rear of a ship (opposite of "forward").
- Athwartships: toward the sides of a ship.
- Aweather: toward the weather or windward side of a ship.
- Aweigh: just clear of the sea floor, as with an anchor.
- Below: a lower deck of the ship.
- Belowdecks: inside or into a ship, or down to a lower deck.
- Bilge: the underwater part of a ship between the flat of the bottom and the vertical topsides
- Bottom: the lowest part of the ship's hull.
- Bow: front of a ship (opposite of "stern")
- Centerline or centreline: an imaginary, central line drawn from the bow to the stern.
- Fore or forward: at or toward the front of a ship or further ahead of a location (opposite of "aft") Preposition form is "before", e.g. "the mainmast is before the mizzenmast".
- Inboard: attached inside the ship.
- Keel: the bottom structure of a ship's hull.
- Leeward: side or direction away from the wind (opposite of "windward").
- On deck: to an outside or muster deck (as "all hands on deck").
- On board: on, onto, or within the ship
- Onboard: somewhere on or in the ship.
- Outboard: attached outside the ship.
- Port: the left side of the ship, when facing forward (opposite of "starboard").
- Starboard: the right side of the ship, when facing forward (opposite of "port").
- Stern: the rear of a ship (opposite of "bow").
- Topside: the top portion of the outer surface of a ship on each side above the waterline.
- Underdeck: a lower deck of a ship.
- Yardarm: an end of a yard spar below a sail.
- Waterline: where the water surface meets the ship's hull.
- Weather: side or direction from which wind blows (same as "windward").
- Windward: side or direction from which wind blows (opposite of "leeward").

== Date of first use ==
- "Aboard": 14th century
- "Aft": 1580
- "Outboard": 1694
- "Inboard": 1830
- "Belowdecks": 1897.

== See also ==
- Deck (ship) - defines the various decks on ships
- Port and starboard - explanation, with signal lights, and history
- Glossary of nautical terms
