= Companionway =

Nautical term

In the architecture of a ship, a companion or companionway is a raised and windowed hatchway in the ship's deck, with a ladder leading below and the hooded entrance-hatch to the main cabins. A companionway may be secured by doors or, commonly in sailboats, hatch boards which fit in grooves in the companionway frame. This allows the lowest board to be left in place during inclement weather to minimize water infiltration. The term may be more broadly used to describe any ladder between decks.

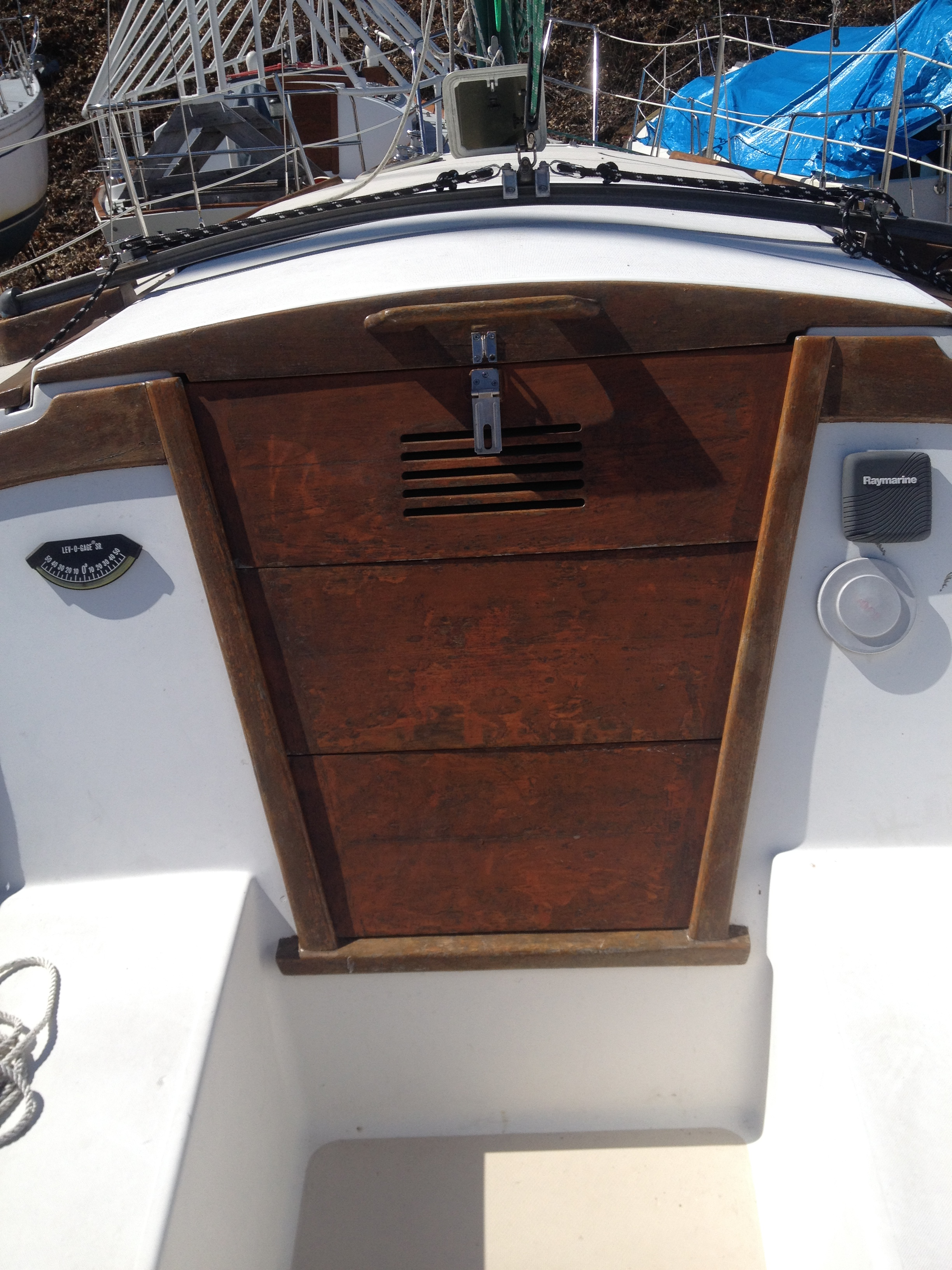
Set of hatch boards in companionway hatch.

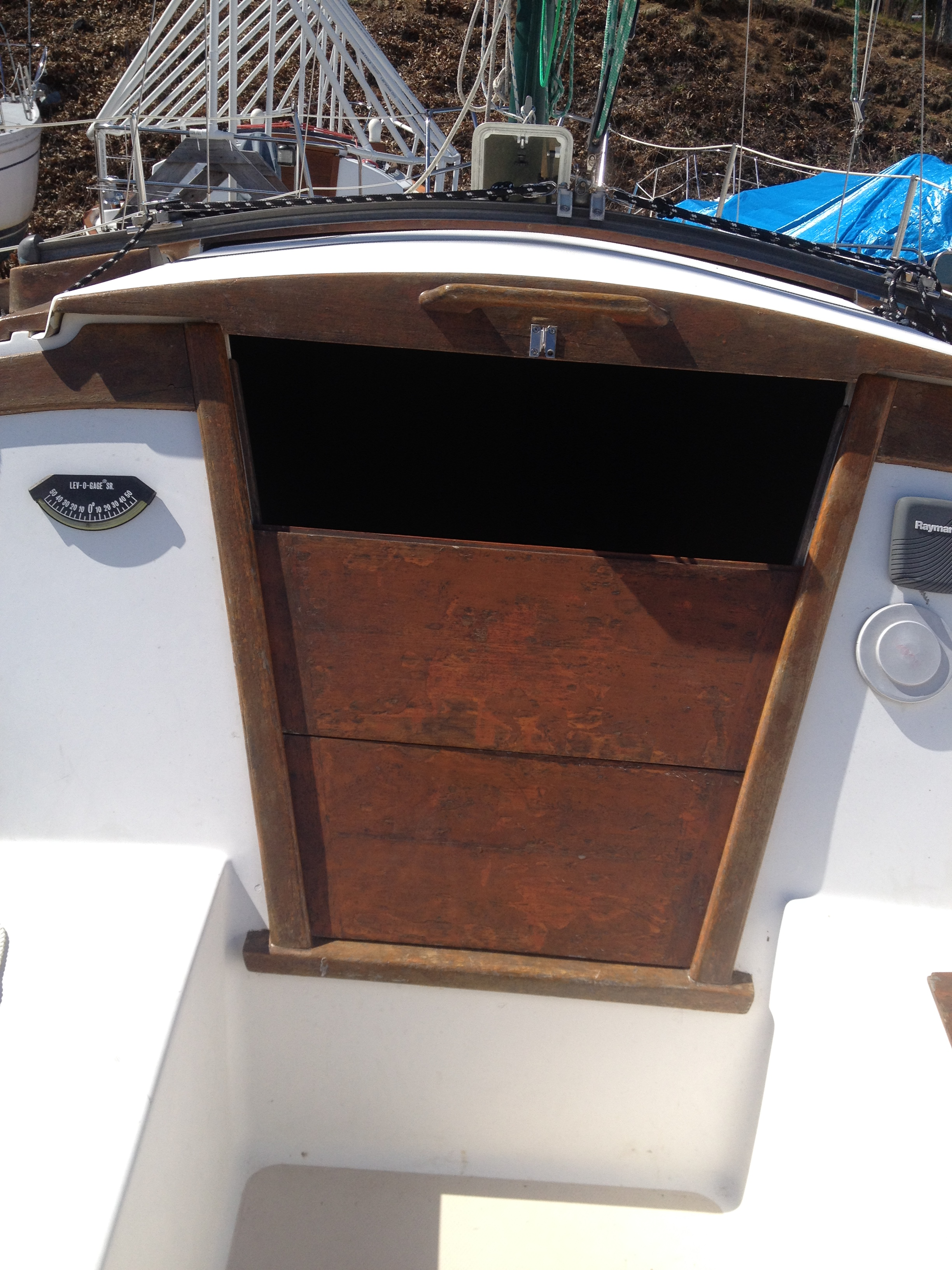
Set of hatch boards with top board removed.

== See also ==
- Glossary of nautical terms (disambiguation)
