= 1836 Hayward earthquake =

Earthquake in California, United States

- UTC time: ??
- ISC event
- USGS-ANSS
- Local date: June 10, 1836
- Local time
- Magnitude: 6.8 M_{w}
- Epicenter: 37.67°N 122.08°W
- Type: Strike-slip
- Areas affected: Alta California, Mexico (now United States)
- Tsunami: No
- Casualties: None reported

The 1836 Hayward earthquake occurred on June 10, 1836, along the Hayward Fault Zone in Alta California, then part of Mexico. The earthquake had an estimated magnitude of 6.8 and caused strong shaking in the San Francisco Bay Area.

Damage was reported at several missions, including Mission San Jose and Mission Santa Clara de Asís. No fatalities were documented.

== Tectonic setting ==
The Hayward Fault is part of the San Andreas Fault system, a major transform boundary between the Pacific Plate and the North American Plate. Earthquakes along this system are typically strike-slip in nature.

== Earthquake ==
The earthquake is known from historical accounts compiled by the United States Geological Survey and related catalogs. Due to the absence of instrumental recordings, its magnitude and location are estimated retrospectively.

Strong shaking damaged buildings and infrastructure at Spanish missions in the region.

== See also ==
- List of earthquakes in California
- List of historical earthquakes
- Hayward Fault Zone
