= Maacama Fault =

Geologic fault in Northern California

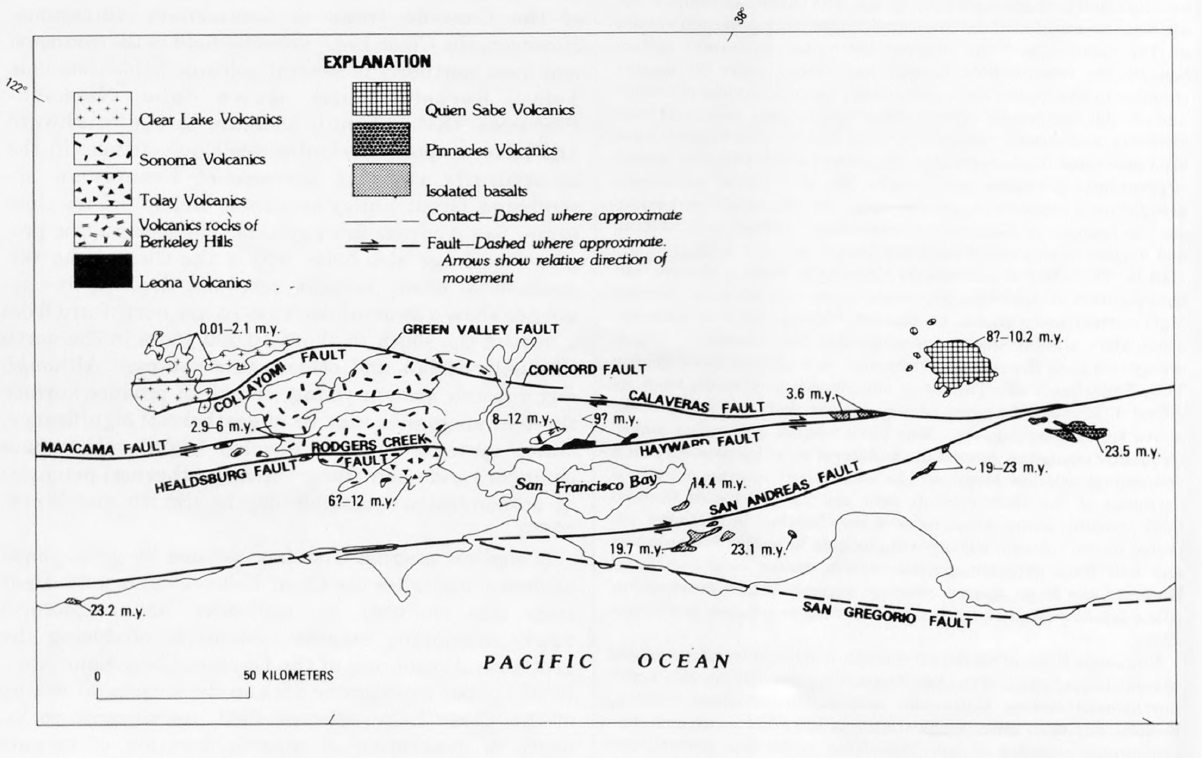
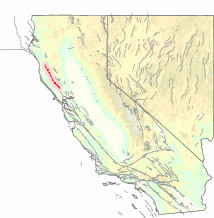
Geological maps of the Maacama Fault

The Maacama Fault is a right lateral-moving (dextral) geologic fault located in the Coast Ranges of northwestern California. It is considered to be the northernmost segment of the Hayward Fault subsystem of the San Andreas Fault zone. Creep along the Maacama is about 8 mm per year, consistent with the steady movement along the rest of the Hayward Fault system. It is also capable of producing large earthquakes.

The Maacama Fault runs just east of Ukiah and just west of Willits.
