= Hayward Fault Zone =

Geological fault in the San Francisco Bay Area

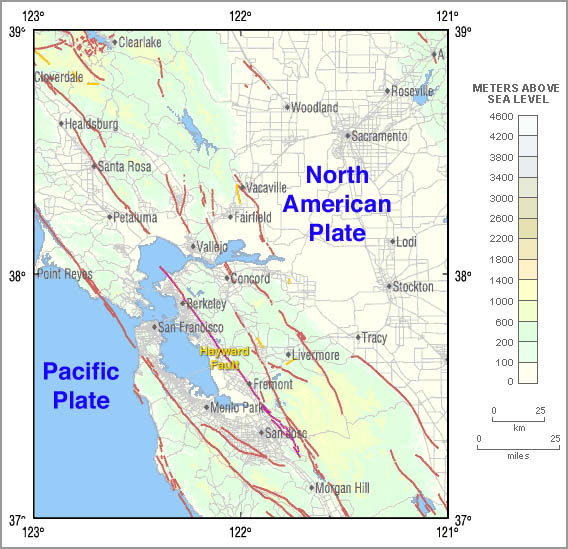
USGS map showing faults that span the Pacific–North America plate boundary

The Hayward Fault Zone is a right-lateral strike-slip geologic fault zone capable of generating destructive earthquakes. The fault was first named in the Lawson Report of the 1906 San Francisco Earthquake in recognition of its involvement in the earthquake of 1868. This fault is about 74 mi (119 km) long, situated mainly along the western base of the hills on the east side of San Francisco Bay. It runs through densely populated areas, including Richmond, El Cerrito, Berkeley, Oakland, San Leandro, Castro Valley, Hayward, Union City, Fremont, and San Jose.

The Hayward Fault is parallel to the San Andreas Fault, which lies offshore and through the San Francisco Peninsula. To the east of the Hayward Fault lies the Calaveras Fault. In 2007, the Hayward Fault was discovered to have merged with the Calaveras Fault east of San Jose at a depth of 4.0 mi (6.4 km), with the potential of creating earthquakes much larger than previously anticipated. Some geologists have suggested that the Southern Calaveras should be renamed as the Southern Hayward.

North of San Pablo Bay is the Rodgers Creek Fault, which was shown in 2016 to be linked with the Hayward Fault under San Pablo Bay to form a combined Hayward-Rodgers Creek Fault that is 120 mi (190 km) long, stretching from north of Healdsburg through Santa Rosa down to Alum Rock in San Jose. Another fault further north, the Maacama Fault, is also considered to be part of the "Hayward Fault subsystem".

While the San Andreas Fault is the principal transform boundary between the Pacific plate and the North American plate, the Hayward-Rodgers Creek Fault takes up its share of the overall displacement of the two plates.

== Tectonic setting ==
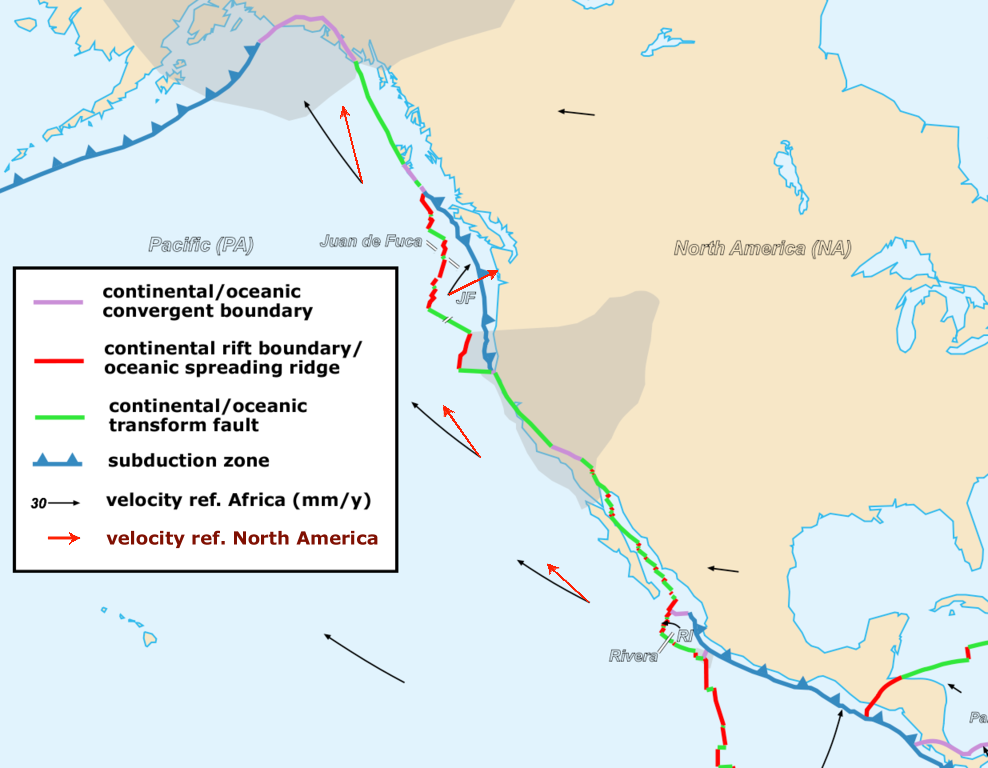
Relative plate motions of North America showing the San Francisco Bay Area centered on the strike-slip San Andreas Fault System

The Pacific plate is a major section of the Earth's crust, gradually expanding by the eruption of magma along the East Pacific Rise to the southeast. It is also being subducted far to the northwest into the Aleutian Trench. In California, the plate is sliding northwestward along a transform boundary, the San Andreas Fault, toward the subduction zone. At the same time, the North American plate is moving southwestward relative to the Earth's core, but southeastward relative to the Pacific plate, due to the latter's much faster northwestward motion. The westward component of the North American plate's motion results in some compressive force along the San Andreas and its associated faults, thus helping lift the Pacific Coast Ranges and other parallel inland ranges to the west of the Central Valley, in this region most notably the Diablo Range. The Hayward Fault shares the same relative motions of the San Andreas. As with portions of other faults, a large extent of the Hayward Fault trace is formed from a narrow complex zone of deformation which can span hundreds of feet in width.

The transform boundary defined by the San Andreas Fault is not perfectly straight, and the stresses between the Pacific and North American plates are diffused over a wide region of the West, extending as far as the Walker Lane east of the Sierra Nevada. The Hayward Fault is one of the secondary faults in this diffuse zone, along with the Calaveras Fault to the east and the San Gregorio Fault, west of the San Andreas.

The complete fault zone, including the Rodgers Creek fault, is divided by seismologists into three segments – Rodgers Creek, Northern Hayward, and Southern Hayward. It is expected that these segments may fail singly or in adjacent pairs, creating earthquakes of varying magnitude. The Association of Bay Area Governments (ABAG) in concert with other government agencies has sponsored the analysis of local conditions and the preparation of maps indicative of the destructive potential of these earthquakes. The various ABAG maps shown below represent some of the more likely possible combinations.

While there are indications that a substantial earthquake on a nearby parallel fault can release stress and so also decrease the near-term probability of an earthquake, the opposite appears to be true concerning sequential segments. A release on a major segment can substantially increase the likelihood of an earthquake on an adjacent fault segment, increasing the likelihood of two major regional earthquakes within a period of a few months.

=== Rodgers Creek Fault Zone ===
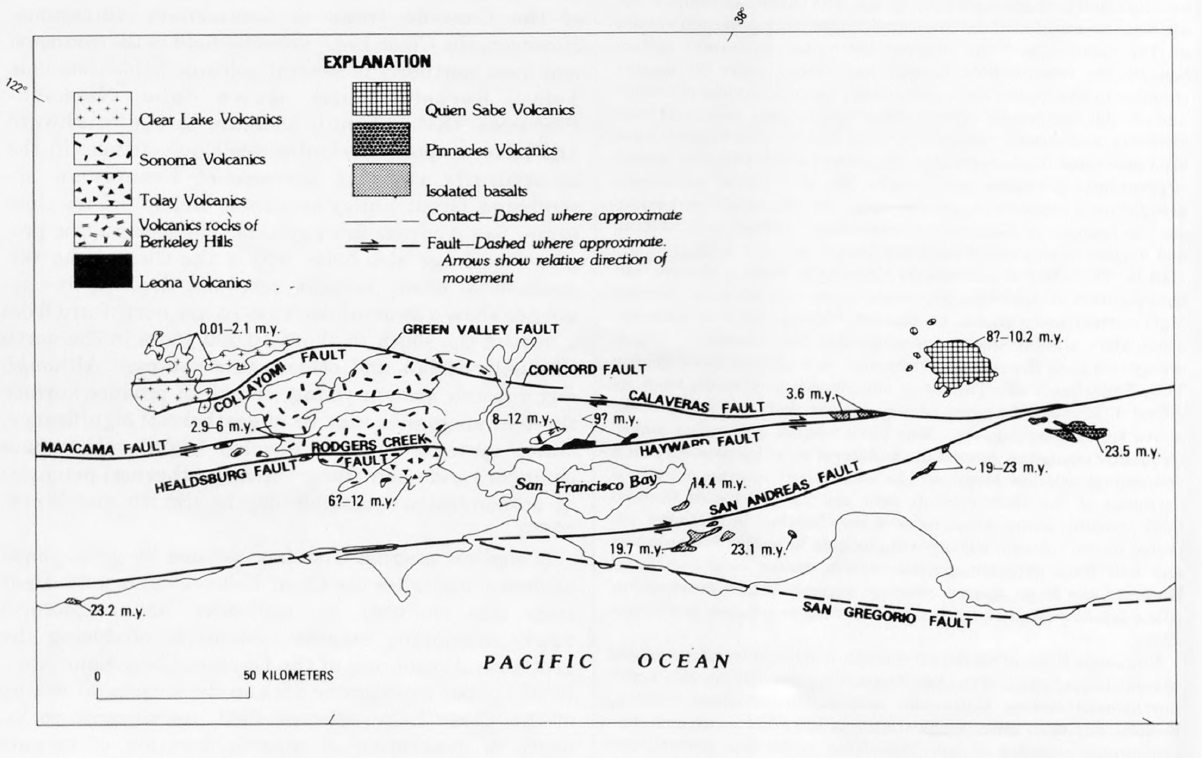
Geological map of the Rodgers Creek Fault

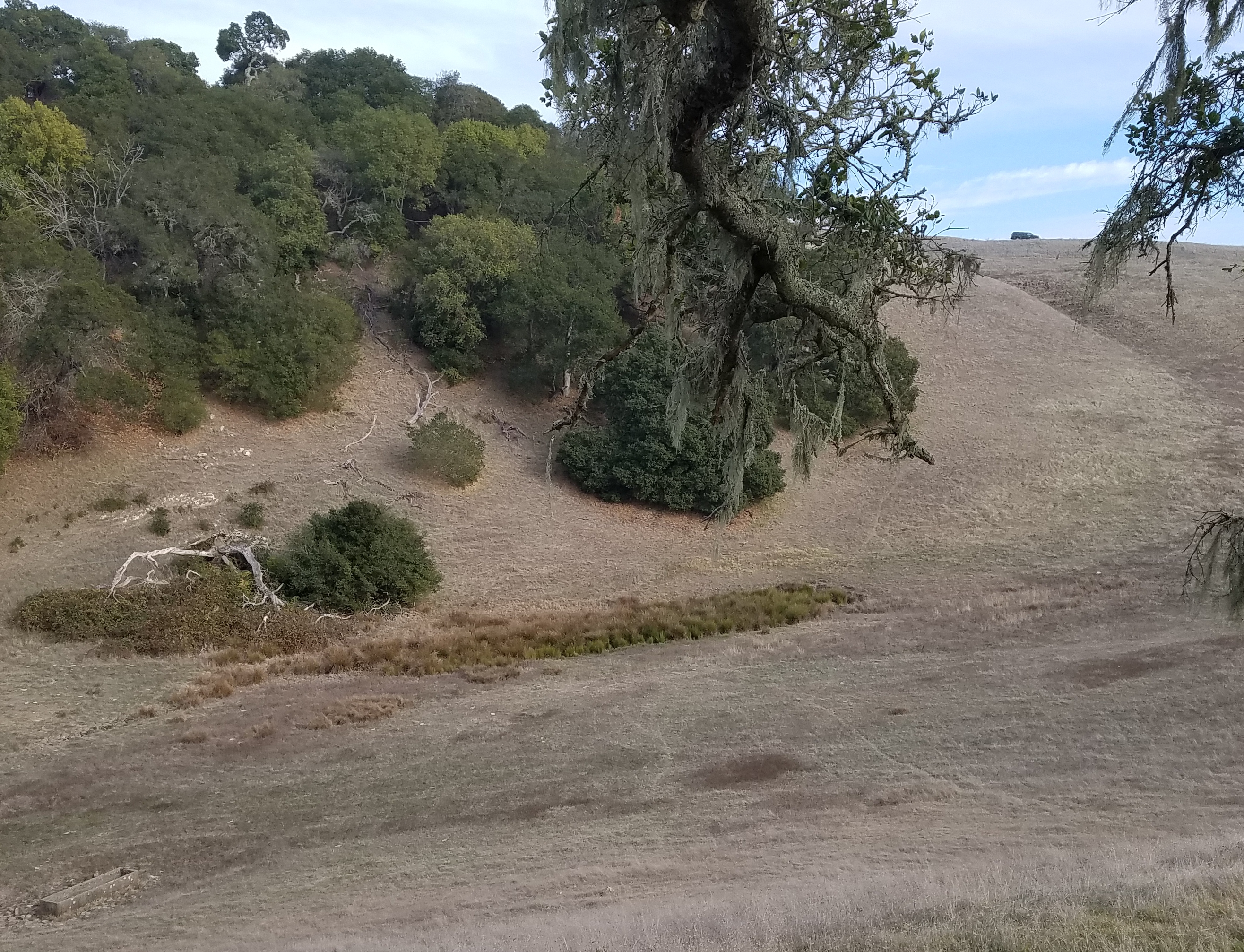
Preferential groundwater flow along the fault emerges as a spring supporting the riparian vegetation in the center of this photo of Taylor Mountain Regional Park. The spring is the source of Cooper Creek which flows northward through a deeply incised canyon along the fault on the southern edge of Santa Rosa, California, to a confluence with Matanzas Creek at Doyle Community Park.

The connection between the Rodgers Creek Fault Zone and the Hayward Fault Zone was unclear until 2015 when a survey of the floor of San Pablo Bay found that the ends of the two faults were smoothly linked between Point Pinole and Lower Tubbs Island. An alternate prior hypothesis suggested that the Hayward Fault and Rodgers Creek Fault were probably connected by a series of en echelon fault strands beneath San Pablo Bay. The new finding means that the Rodgers-Hayward system together could produce a quake with a magnitude as high as 7.2. It is also considered possible that a major seismic event on either fault may involve movement on the other, either concurrently or within an interval of up to several months. The Association of Bay Area Governments has prepared ground shaking maps that include a possible concurrent scenario (these are shown below).

In October 2016, scientists found definitive evidence that the Rodgers Creek Fault and the Hayward Fault are linked together under San Pablo Bay. A simultaneous rupture of the connected Hayward-Rodgers Creek Fault – about 118 mi (190 km) long from just north of Healdsburg down to Alum Rock in San Jose – could result in a major earthquake of magnitude 7.4 that "would cause extensive damage and loss of life with global economic impact". It has been suggested that the name "Rodgers Creek Fault" be retired and that the entire 118-mile (190 km) fault be known as the "Hayward Fault".

=== Calaveras Fault ===
The Calaveras Fault is continuous from the Sunol area south to Hollister. It was long believed that there was no connection between the Hayward Fault and the Calaveras, but geological studies (particularly the examination of very small and deep earthquakes) suggest that the two may be connected. If true, this link would have significant implications for the potential maximum strength of earthquakes on the Hayward, since this strength is determined by the maximum length of the fault rupture and this rupture could extend beyond the juncture point and so include some portion of the Calaveras. (This potential is not shown in the shake intensity maps shown below.)

== Earthquakes ==
The largest quake on the Hayward Fault in recorded history occurred in 1868, with an estimated magnitude of 7.0. It occurred on the southern segment of the fault, receiving its name (some decades later) from the nascent town of Hayward where it was determined the quake's epicenter was located. However, the 1868 quake caused much damage throughout the then sparsely settled Bay Area, including the city of San Francisco. In fact, the 1868 event became known as the "Great San Francisco earthquake" until the larger tremor in 1906.

Many seismologists believe that the 1906 San Francisco earthquake, which occurred on the San Andreas fault, reduced the stress on many faults in the Bay Area including the Hayward fault, creating an "earthquake shadow": a quiescent period following a major earthquake. Since the 1906 San Andreas event there have been no moderately strong earthquakes on the Hayward fault as were seen before that earthquake. It also appears likely that this quiet period in the earthquake shadow is ending, as projected by the rate of plate motion and the stress state of other faults in the region.

Hayward Fault Zone earthquakes with a minimum Mercalli intensity of VI (Strong)
Date	Region	Mag.	MMI	Deaths	Total damage / notes
1864-05-21	South Hayward area	5.3 M_{la}	VI		
1868-10-21	Bay Area	6.3–6.7 M_{w}	IX	30	$350,000 in property damage
1870-04-02	Berkeley	5.3 M_{la}	VI		
1889-07-31	Alameda County	5.2 M_{la}	VII		
Note: Stover & Coffman 1993 uses various seismic scales. M_{la} is a local magnitude (equivalent to M_{L}) for events that occurred prior to the instrumental period and is based on the area of perceptibility (as presented on isoseismal maps).

The 1868 earthquake occurred well before the East Bay region was extensively urbanized. The following year, in 1869, the William Meek Estate became one of the first developments in the area, built on 3,000 acres (12 km^{2}) in what became known as the Cherryland district of Eden Township. Recent renovations of the Meek Mansion have revealed that with the 1868 earthquake still fresh in minds of residents of the time, some unusual diagonal bracing was built into the original construction. Although its magnitude was less than the 1906 San Francisco earthquake, the intensity of shaking experienced in the Hayward area may have been greater than in 1906 due to the proximity of the Hayward Fault.

Earlier earthquakes have been detected by trench exposure and associated radiocarbon dating. Combined with the historic record, the last five major events were in 1315, 1470, 1630, 1725, and 1868, which have intervals of about 140 years. The longest time was the 160-year period between 1470 and 1630. As of 2026, it has been 158 years since the 1868 event.

== Probability of future activity ==
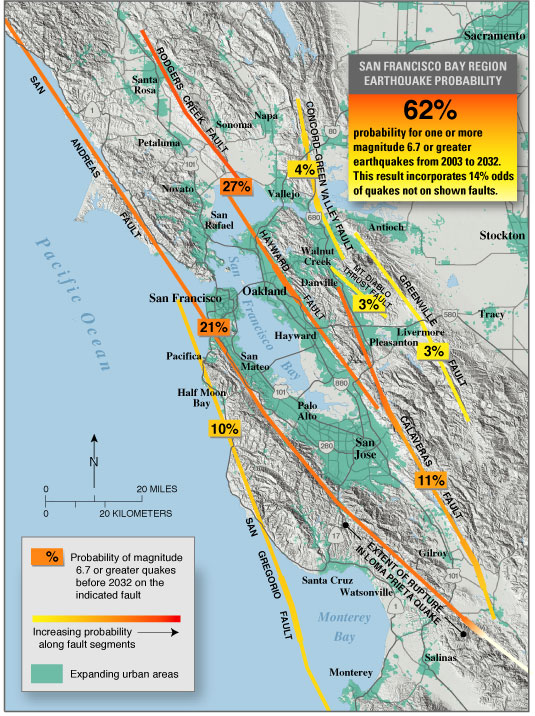
San Francisco Bay region earthquake probability

United States Geological Survey (USGS) scientists state that a major earthquake occurring on the zone is "increasingly likely". When the next major earthquake occurs on the fault, damage will be catastrophic. More than 1.5 trillion U.S. dollars in property exists in the affected area, and more than 165 billion US dollars in damage would likely result if the 1868 earthquake were to reoccur. Since the fault runs through heavily populated areas, more than 5 million would be affected directly. Water could be cut off to 2.4 million people living in California's San Francisco Bay Area.

For the thirty years following 2014, the probability of there being one or more magnitude 6.7+ earthquakes on the Hayward Fault during that time frame was estimated at 14.3 percent. This is compared to 6.4 percent for the San Andreas Fault, which can have larger earthquakes but is farther away from a significant portion of the urbanized parts of the Bay Area. Earlier (January 2008) assessments suggest that the Hayward, Rodgers Creek, and Calaveras faults may be more likely to fail in the next few decades than previously thought.

The 140th anniversary of the 1868 event was in 2008, and the average time between the last five major events is also averaged at 140 years. Recent estimates of the damage potential of a major Hayward Fault earthquake by a professional risk management firm indicate the potential for huge economic losses, of which only a small percentage is insured against earth movement. (Earthquake insurance is not only quite expensive, it tends to be burdened with large deductibles – at least 15 percent).

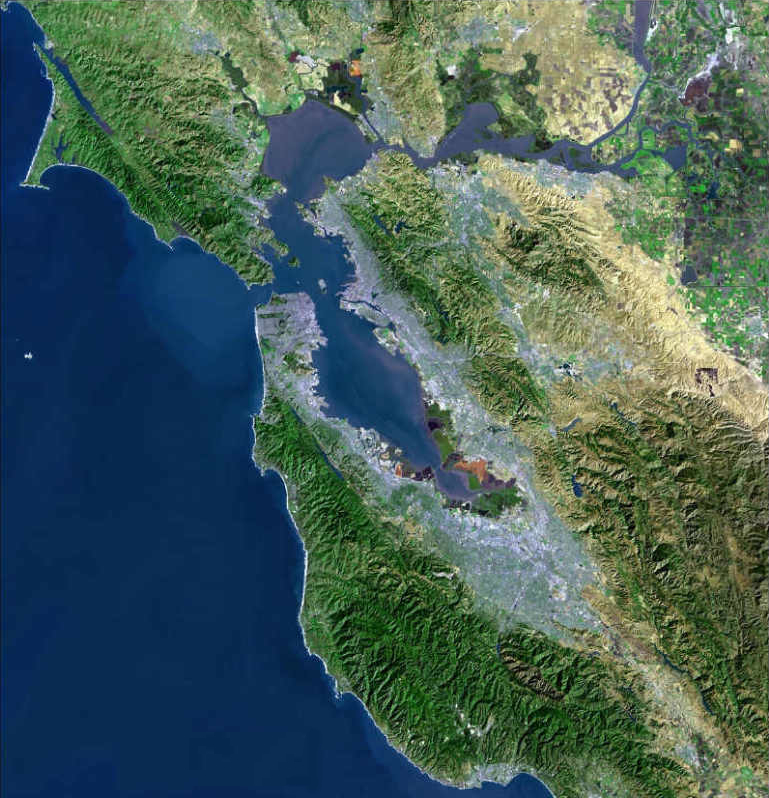
USGS satellite photo of the San Francisco Bay Area. Light gray areas are heavily urbanized regions.

Depending upon seasonal weather conditions at the time of a major event a seismic event could be followed by urban wildfires compounded by damage to water systems or massive landslides in saturated soils. In addition to direct damage the effects on commerce due to damaged infrastructure would also be substantial. Experience with large area urban destruction such as caused by earthquake, hurricane, and firestorms has shown that complete rebuilding can take up to a decade, owing to various factors.

The progressively more severe reports and estimates of event probability and consequences have awakened a broad interest in training people for emergency response. It is becoming widely understood that professional fire fighting, police, and medical services will be overwhelmed by a major event and that neighbors will have to assist each other as best they can. Several jurisdictions in the affected area have implemented volunteer Community emergency response team programs to augment the professional response services.

In 2012, USGS scientists said the fault was due for another magnitude 6.8 to 7.0 earthquake, with the California Geological Survey concurring, stating they believe there is a 31 percent chance of a magnitude-6.7 earthquake or greater along the Rodgers Creek-Hayward Fault in the next 30 years.

In March 2015, the United States Geological Survey released "UCERF3: A New Earthquake Forecast for California's Complex Fault System". The UCERF3 represents the best available science to date, and it now considers "multifault ruptures" and "fault readiness", in addition to historical seismicity, in the calculus of earthquake forecasting. The upshot, for those who live in the San Francisco Bay Area, is that experts say there is a 72% chance of experiencing a magnitude 6.7 or greater earthquake before 2045. Moreover, they had a 51% chance of a M≥7 (threshold to be considered a "major" quake), a 20% chance of a M≥7.5 and a 4% chance of a M≥8 (a "great" quake) when all the mapped faults in the region are taken in to account.

== Fault effects ==
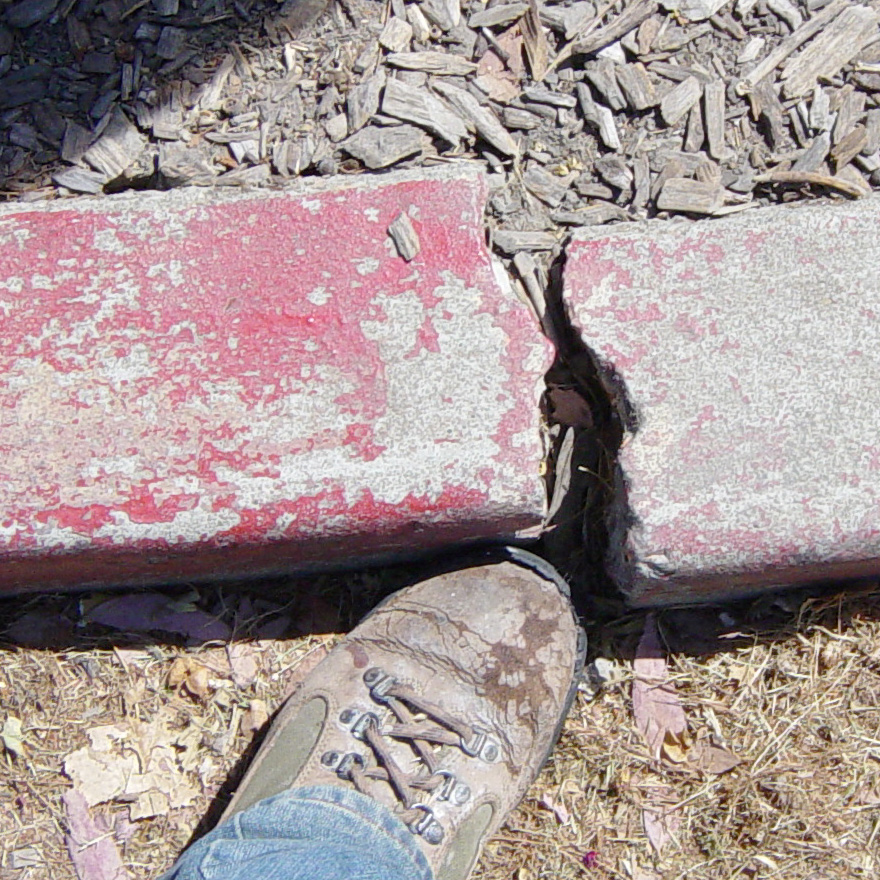
The effects of 15 years of fault creep on a curb in Fremont

=== Fault creep ===
The surface of the fault is creeping at less than 0.5 cm (0.2 in) per year in the regions of concern. Extreme southern regions of the fault are creeping more quickly, perhaps sufficiently to prevent fault rupture there, but mostly the creep is insufficient to relieve the accumulating forces upon most of the fault and so will not prevent a large earthquake. The creep is sufficient to displace roads, curbs, and sidewalks and so visibly reveal the surface trace in many locations. Creep damage to asphalt road surfaces will usually appear as a series of echelon cracks. Creep effects may be seen also in older structures crossing the fault, some of which have been fitted with expansion joints to accommodate this slow motion.

=== Earthquake shaking ===
The magnitude of an earthquake, as indicated on a seismic scale, is roughly proportional to the length of the rupture, while the ground motion in the region surrounding the fault is highly dependent upon the local soil conditions, somewhat upon the distance and relationship to the progression of the fault rupture, and (as recently recognized in the 1989 Loma Prieta earthquake) reflected energy from deep discontinuities in the Earth's structure. The area affected by an earthquake is also dependent upon the density and uniformity of the soils surrounding the fault.

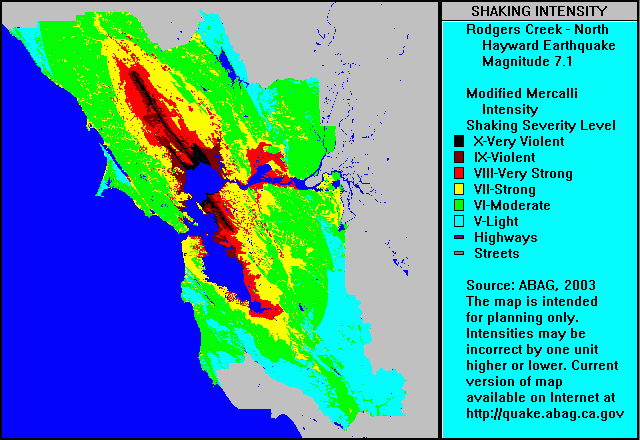
Combined Rodgers Creek and northern Hayward fault slip, magnitude 7.1

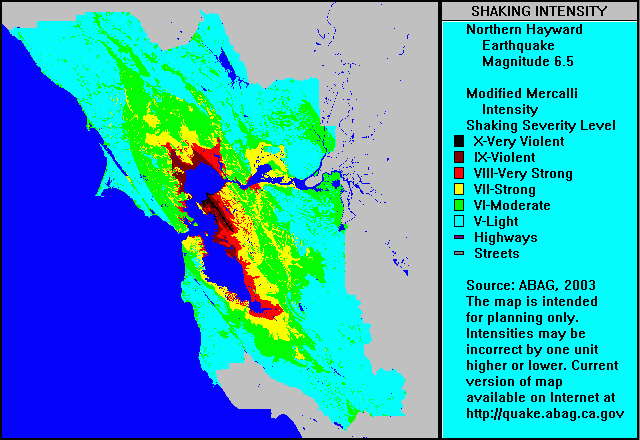
Northern Hayward fault slip, magnitude 6.5 *

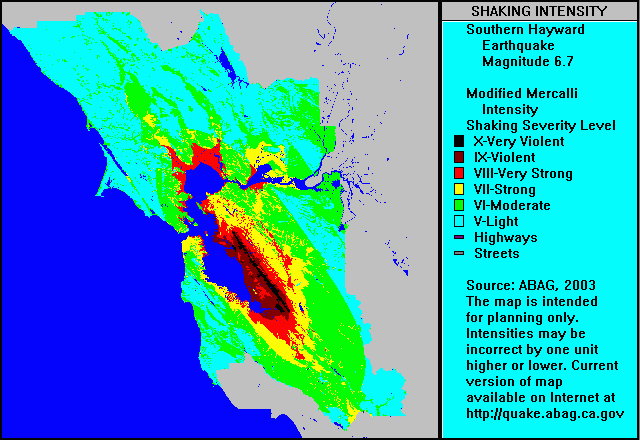
Southern Hayward fault slip, magnitude 6.7 *

*Recent examination of damage reports from the 1868 event suggest that the rupture over only portions of the Northern and Southern Hayward fault could generate a magnitude 7.0 event, far more powerful than either the 6.5 event shown here or the 6.7 previously recognized as a likely maximum.
The terms used by ABAG for shaking intensity differ from the official descriptions of the Mercalli intensity scale, being somewhat softened (perhaps due to the extensive local experience with earthquakes), with terms such as "Rather Strong" becoming "Light", and "Ruinous" and "Disastrous" becoming variations of "Violent".

==== Bayside soil conditions ====
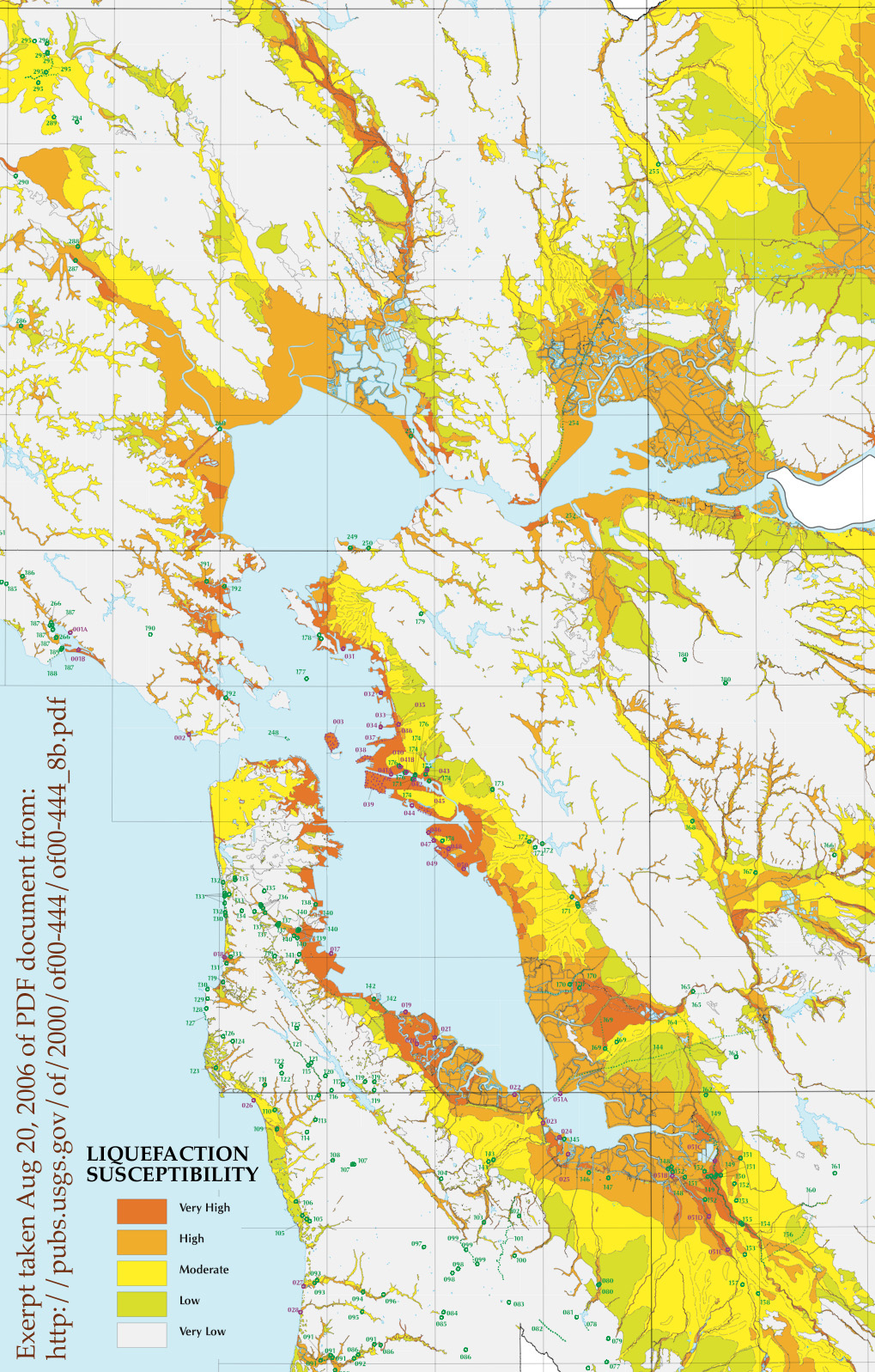
Liquefaction susceptibility map – excerpt of USGS map. Maps indicating shake amplification have similar appearance.

The Hayward fault is considered to be particularly dangerous due to the poor soil conditions in the alluvial plain that drops from the East Bay Hills to the eastern shoreline of San Francisco Bay. At the lower elevations near the bay the soil is mostly water saturated mud and sand, placed in the early 20th century as fill in marsh areas. This soil tends to amplify the effects of an earthquake and so producing significantly greater ground motion. Additionally, the soil itself can fail, turning into a liquid mud from the agitation, a mud unable to support buildings erected upon once-firm soil. This region is also covered with dense low-rise urban development, most of which was built soon after the 1906 San Francisco earthquake, and long before even moderately earthquake resistant construction practices had been developed in the late 1920s.

Further improvement in the construction of resistant structures and the development of retrofitting method have only recently been developed, largely in response to the effects of the 1971 Sylmar, 1989 Loma Prieta, and 1994 Northridge events in California – none of which were hugely catastrophic, but each of which caused loss of life in structures not thought to be vulnerable, and so increased public, engineering, and government awareness of the need for specific remediations and construction methods required for improved life safety.

Although many structures have undergone seismic retrofitting there are a large number of dangerous unreinforced masonry (mostly brick) structures and chimneys, which can be extremely hazardous to occupants in a large earthquake, and a large number of buildings which are either not bolted to their foundations or with soft stories that are insufficiently resistant to shear forces. Foundation and soft story weaknesses are easily remediated in most cases, but this is only effective if the work is competently done, with proper attention to minor details such as nailing patterns and proper connections. Local surveys of recently completed work have exposed deficient workmanship in a number of cases involving household retrofits.

==== Landslides ====
There are many small active landslides and evidence of numerous large archaic landslides in the Berkeley Hills. Such areas may be stable only under present conditions. There is the possibility that a large earthquake could trigger very large earth flows, particularly if the soils are seasonally saturated with water, possibly rendering extensive areas unbuildable. (See the Virtual tour – Google Earth Flyover below.)

=== Potentially impacted structures and features ===
Many structures near the bay shore on either side would probably be severely affected by either a major Hayward Fault rupture or a nearby San Andreas Fault rupture. Severe effects were seen in both Oakland and northern San Francisco from the 1989 Loma Prieta earthquake, even though this event was not extremely large and was centered a significant distance away in the Santa Cruz Mountains. Most of the severe effects of that event were due to poorly responding soil conditions and design deficiencies in large structures. Only a portion of the structural deficiencies in the larger area have been addressed, and the surface motion effects of a large event are likely to be far more severe than seen in the Loma Prieta event.

==== Freeways and overcrossings ====
Many modifications have been made to freeway structures to reduce life hazards during seismic events. Significant adverse conditions remain which can cause disruption with possible long-term effects upon critical traffic infrastructure despite these modifications.

Warren Freeway portion of Highway 13

In its northern extent, the Hayward Fault lies directly beneath the portion of Highway 13 (the Warren Freeway) that is south of its intersection with Highway 24 and north of its terminal connection with Interstate 580 (the MacArthur Freeway). In this rift valley there are a number of elevated street crossings in the Montclair District that cross the fault.

Highway 24

State Highway 24, connecting Oakland to Orinda, Lafayette, and Walnut Creek through the Caldecott Tunnel, is composed of extensive earth fill at the location where the fault is crossed. An earthquake may cause minor landsliding on some slopes of the freeway, and the plastic movement of the fill would likely disrupt the pavement if the movement here of the surface displacement is substantial, possibly presenting a hazard to motorists and shutting down the highway for a while. More extensive disruption and greater hazard could be caused by the failure of elevated structures, both those over which the highway passes and overcrossings of the freeway, of which there are two nearby. As elsewhere in the area, such structures have undergone extensive retrofitting for safety.

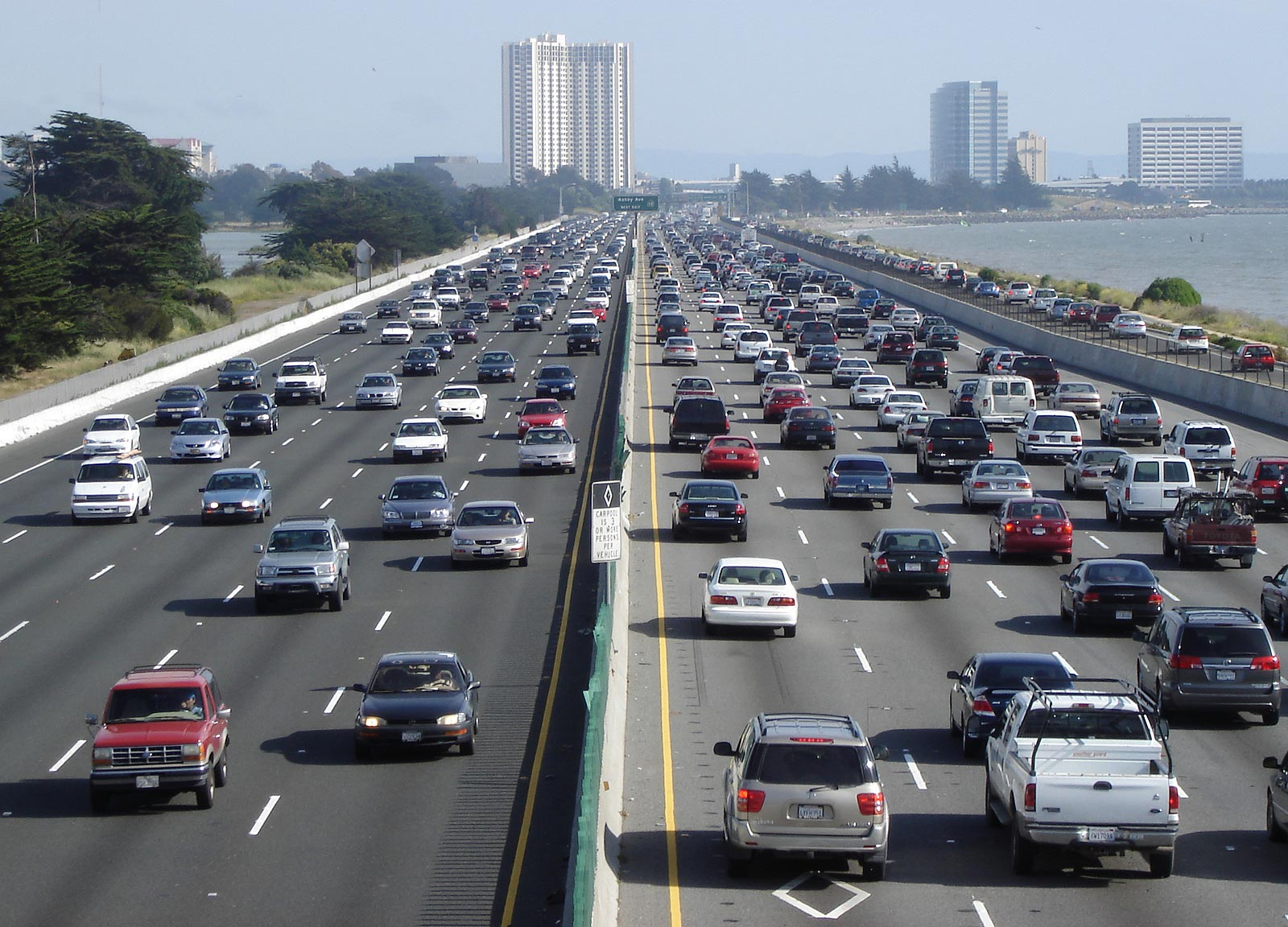
Eastshore Freeway

Highways 80 and 880 and the Port of Oakland

A severe earthquake is likely to disable the offshore causeway portions of Interstate Highway 80 (the Eastshore Freeway), since it is built on fill placed in the 1930s atop mudflats whose upper layers were deposited in the 19th century as a result of extensive hydraulic gold mining in the distant Sierra Nevada mountain foothills. This soft mud is expected to amplify earthquake shaking, and the mud supporting the heavy fill may liquefy, and so possibly cause major disruption of the highway due to failure by sinking of the highway and by differential movement of large sections. (More modern construction for these conditions employs linked and "floating" – in mud – lightweight concrete and plastic foam box structures to support a road.) Similar conditions underlie the eastern approach roads to the Bay Bridge. Better, but still locally poor soils underlie the portion of Interstate Highway 880 that extends to the South Bay region from the MacArthur Maze. As the bulk of cargo containers from the Port of Oakland travel on these two roads, the disabling of both would cause severe disruption of West Coast import and export goods, owing to the consequent overloading of other West Coast container handling ports.

Highway 580

A major route for commuters traveling from Southern Alameda County, the San Joaquin Valley and the East Bay hills to downtown Oakland and San Francisco, Interstate 580 crosses the fault, and runs very close to the fault between the intersections with State Route 13 (the Warren Freeway) and Interstate 238.

==== San Francisco–Oakland Bay Bridge ====
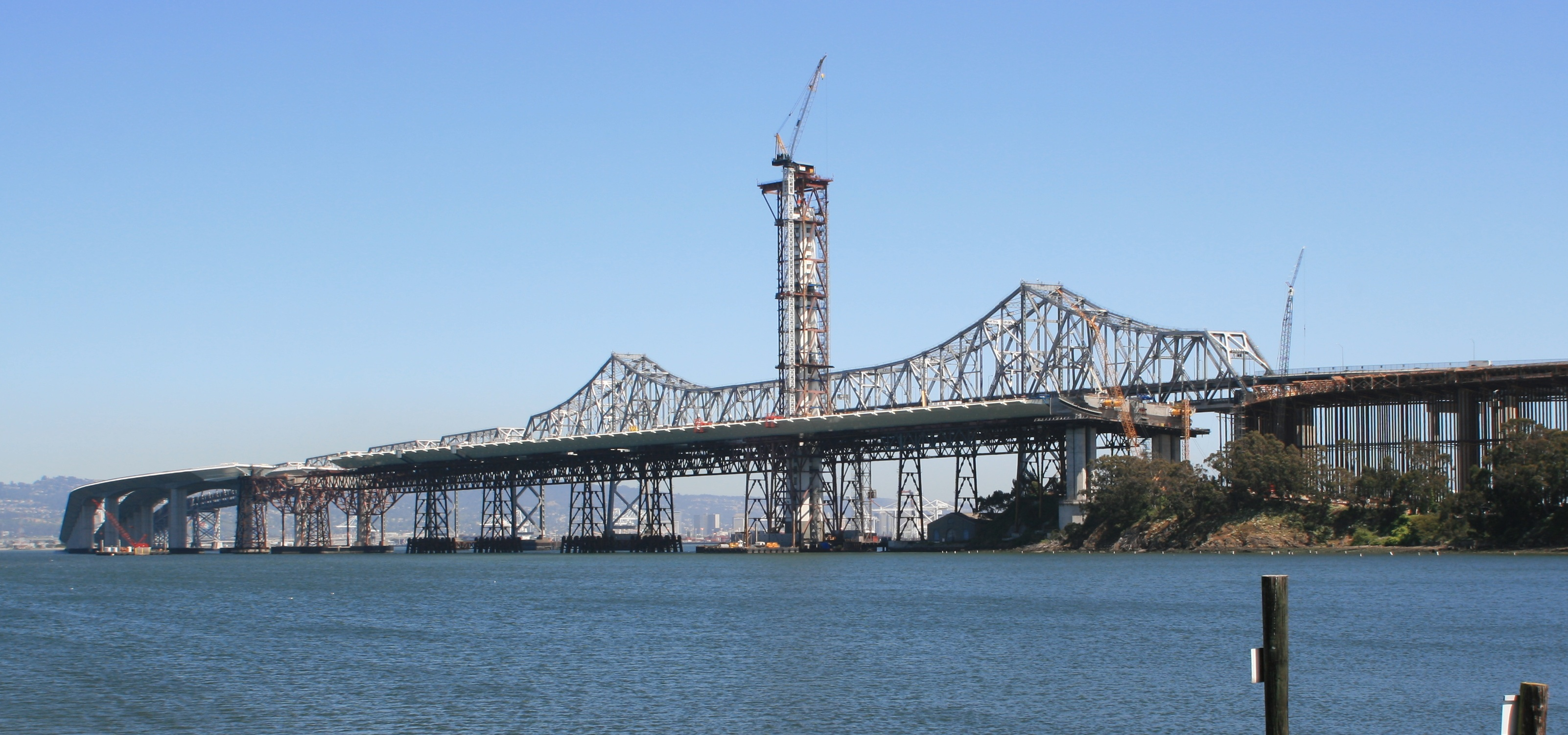
Eastern span and replacement construction

The 1989 Loma Prieta earthquake caused a failure of a single section of the upper deck of the eastern span of the San Francisco–Oakland Bay Bridge, which closed the bridge for 30 days. A replacement of the eastern span was completed in August 2013. Engineers and much of the public had long recognized that a strong earthquake centered close to the bridge on either the Hayward or San Andreas faults could cause a complete collapse of the eastern span.

==== Railroads ====
Parallel to the Eastshore Freeway and inland only two blocks is a four-track railroad route used for general freight traffic, including that generated by the Port of Oakland (Union Pacific and BNSF railroads) and by Amtrak passenger traffic to the Pacific Northwest and eastward through Reno and Salt Lake City. Along the north shore of Contra Costa County, substantial amounts of pressurized liquid gas, flammable liquids, caustic materials, and various toxics are stored temporarily in bulk railcars adjacent to passenger and freight traffic mainlines, with great potential hazards should a derailment occur. Derailments have often occurred during major earthquakes, both directly by tipping and by roadbed failures; industrial accidents involving these materials have caused extensive health hazards in the mixed residential–industrial areas of Richmond.

==== Bay Area Rapid Transit ====
In addition to extensive modifications to over crossings and elevated structures, largely to prevent dismantling due to shaking or destruction by soil failure, several other unique system feature require special treatment.

Transbay tube

BART trains travel between San Francisco and Oakland through an underwater tube structure. The tube is composed of welded plate steel segments. Each oval outer section carries two inner train tubes of circular cross section and a central rectangular access and rescue tunnel, with the void between elements filled with concrete. The segments were sunk into a ditch dredged through bay mud and covered with rock fill, and then pumped free of water upon completion, making the resulting tube somewhat buoyant, but held in place with a rock overfill. Subsequent seismic analysis indicated the possibility that the overfill could fail due to agitation, allowing the buoyant tube to float upward, misaligning the tracks and possibly overstressing the bolted connections. This potential problem has been addressed by vibratory compaction of the overfill covering the tube. Additional stabilization includes the driving of large pilings and the connection of additional restraints.

Slip joint

The Transbay Tube terminates at an under-bay slip joint near the Embarcadero Station in San Francisco. The designed slip margin has been reduced by half due to unforeseen settlement of the tube structure. The projected worst-case motion at this joint has been determined to be beyond that for which the joint is presently capable, which could cause severe structural problems and mud and water entry into the tube and adjacent subway systems. This is to be corrected at great expense – first estimated at $142 million but expected to cost far more – probably the largest single cost item in the list of BART seismic retrofits.

Berkeley Hills Tunnel

In June 2006 Bay Area Rapid Transit (BART) management announced that they have elected not to modify the Berkeley Hills Tunnel, which actually penetrates the Hayward Fault, arguing that it would be cheaper (and less disruptive to current operations) to rebore a misaligned portion after the fact than to protect riders (either by extensive modifications of the tunnel or by replacing it with a higher bore) against the small likelihood that a train (or two) would crash into or be cut in two by a major slippage of the fault. Modified train scheduling to prevent multiple train exposure at faults has been determined by BART engineers to be impractical due to variations in train passage, but automated event-related realtime train operational response is considered practical (see below).

Seismic sensor network

BART has installed and continues to enhance a network of seismic sensors (an earthquake warning system) to trigger a system halt in the event of a major event, this to include automated event progression analysis to determine the best action with regard to individual trains for maximum safety (a fault rip can take up to several tens of seconds to completely propagate from the epicenter to the more distant affected locations). Such sensor networks and warning devices have a potential to reduce the hazards from falling objects and furnishings provided that the people notified are well trained in appropriate responses (similar to the Cold War's "duck and cover" training of schoolchildren).

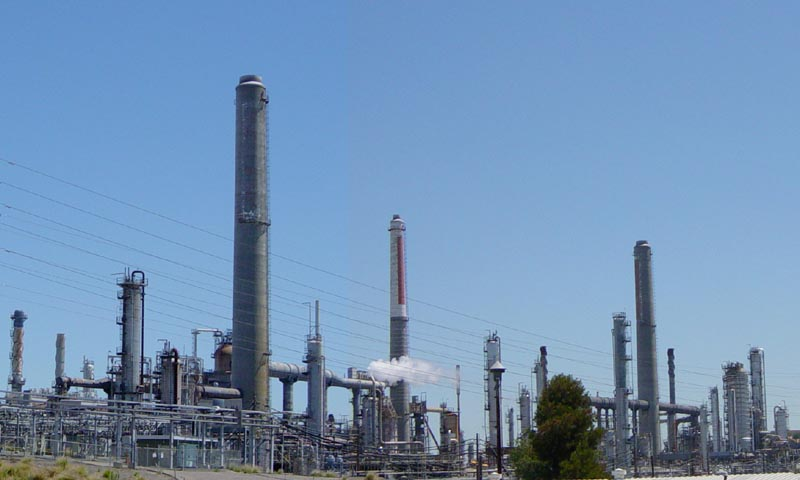
Shell Oil Refinery in Martinez, California

==== Refineries ====
Of primary concern with respect to the Hayward Fault is the huge Chevron Richmond Refinery in Richmond. Although founded on better ground than most of the shoreline, this refinery has extensive crude oil and finished product docks and pipelines extending into the bay, which could produce catastrophic spills into the bay, with the potential to adversely affect hundreds of miles of sensitive wetlands. Dismantling of high pressure and temperature process units and the consequent fire danger to personnel and equipment could produce substantial economic consequences for the western states. Large liquid storage tanks are protected by berms that are designed to contain the contents should a tank fail under normal conditions. Similar process and product conditions exist at other refineries further inland near Martinez, but mostly these plants are exposed to earthquakes from other faults.

==== Fuel pipelines ====
Gasoline is continuously shipped under pressure from Richmond and Martinez area refineries through Kinder Morgan Energy Partners pipelines which run under heavily populated East Bay urban areas to tank terminals near San Jose Airport in North San Jose. Aviation fuels are piped from these same refineries to the Oakland Airport. A number of spills have previously occurred due to landslides and such spill and related toxic and flammable material release may be prevalent in a major seismic event. A November 9, 2004, construction accident on this pipeline system in Walnut Creek killed five people. As seen in other worldwide pipeline ruptures, even an instantaneous stop of pumping would take several minutes to significantly lower pipeline pressure after a break, and would likely result in the release of significant amounts of flammable liquid fuels. Chevron also has a petroleum products pipeline that crosses the fault.

Pacific Gas & Electric Company has numerous gas distribution lines crossing or near the Hayward Fault. Several PG&E gas transmission pipelines also cross the fault. After the San Bruno pipeline explosion, which was unrelated to seismic activity, it took PG&E crews 95 minutes to stop the gas flow to both ends of that failed pipeline.

==== Bay Area water supplies ====
East Bay Municipal Utility District (EBMUD) supplies water to 800,000 East Bay customers who live west of the Berkeley Hills. Prior to the adoption and implementation of a $200 million seismic improvement project all of the water for these customers went through one vulnerable tunnel that crosses the Hayward Fault near the Caldecott Tunnel. As part of this project, that tunnel – the Claremont Tunnel – was seismically retrofitted. Additionally, EBMUD created a second route to bring water to these west-of-the-hills customers through the Southern Loop Bypass near Castro Valley. The Southern Loop was completed in 2002, while the seismic retrofitting of the Claremont tunnel was completed in February 2007.

The Hetch Hetchy Aqueduct, which supplies 270–315 million US gallons (1,020,000–1,190,000 m^{3}) of water per day to the City of San Francisco and other Bay Area communities, directly crosses the Hayward Fault in Fremont. A 2002 report by the Bay Area Economic Forum suggests that a breakdown in the aqueduct due to an earthquake could cut off Hetch Hetchy water to the Bay Area for 60 days. In addition to depriving 85% of San Francisco residents of their drinking water, this would cut off supplies for firefighting and water-intensive industry, causing economic damage of $17.2–28.7 billion. Extensive reconstruction work at the Hayward Fault crossing includes a multi-sectioned tunnel structure to allow shear without collapse, this is to contain a section of water pipe with ball joints and a slip joint.

==== Lake Temescal ====
The fault continues north under the eastern margin of Lake Temescal and its dam, which is unlikely to fail since it has been completely reinforced by the extensive earth fill supporting the subsequently improved Highway 24.

==== University of California, Berkeley ====
Many of the structures at the UC Berkeley academic campus have been self-rated as having "poor" earthquake performance. Numerous chemical, radiological, and biohazardous materials are present (in relatively small quantities) on campus and on the associated Lawrence Berkeley National Laboratory, in the hills above the university. However, the university has undertaken an extensive retrofitting project over the past decade to systematically retrofit all academic buildings on Campus to withstand a significant earthquake.

Memorial Stadium

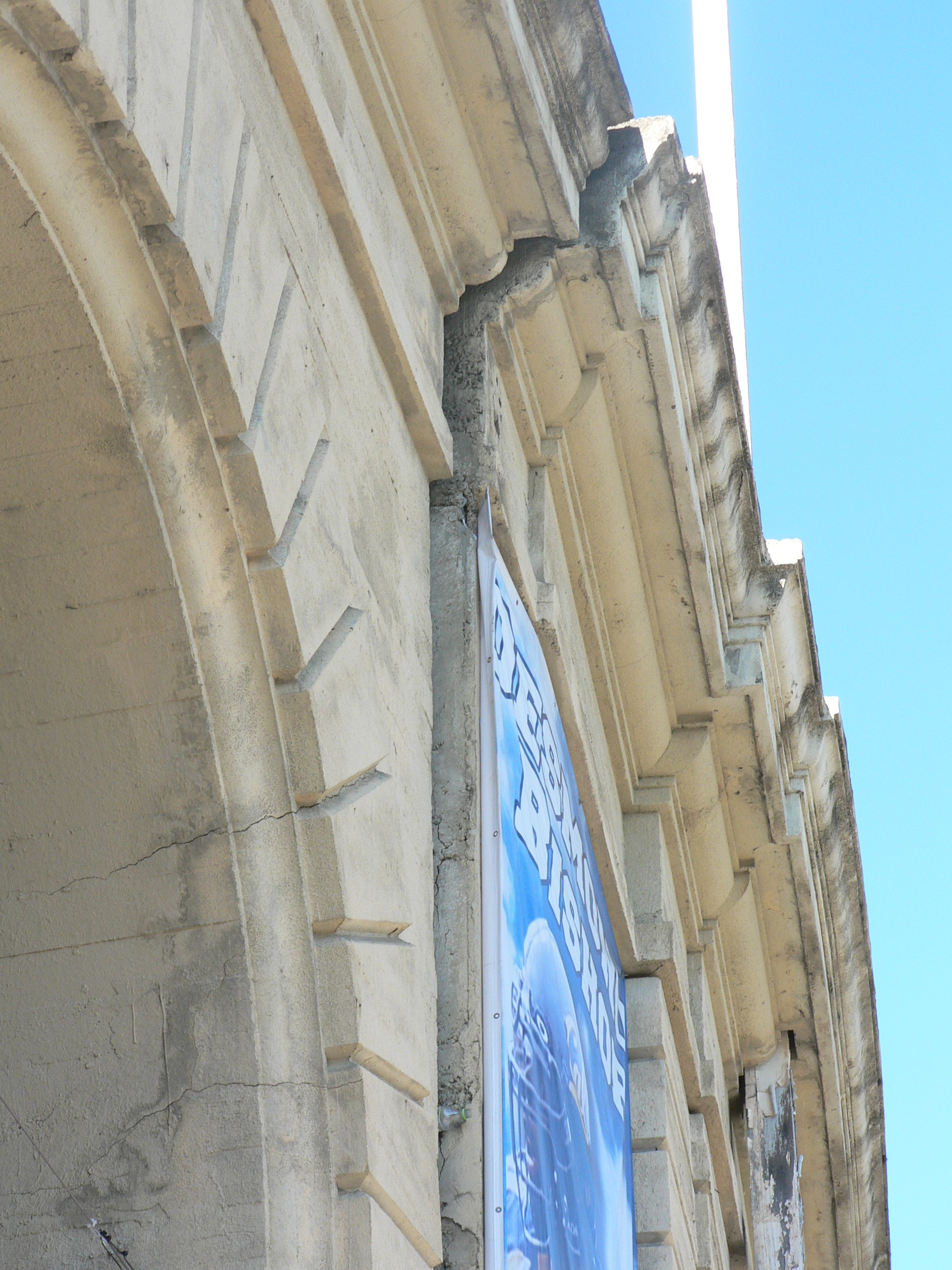
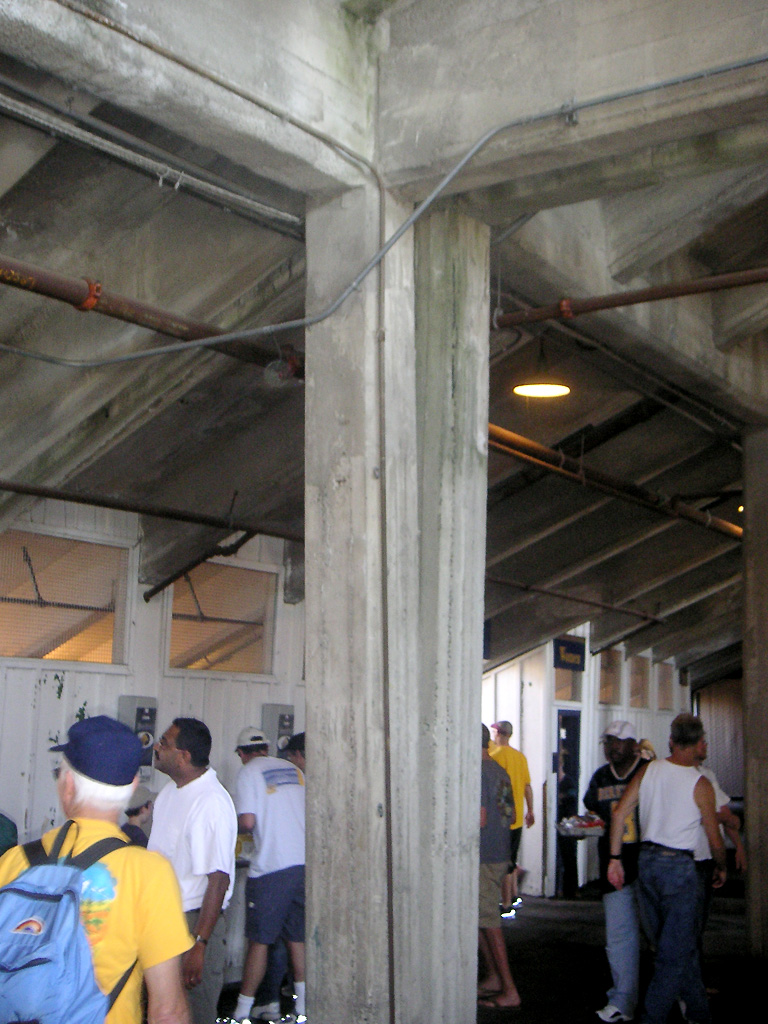
Memorial Stadium supporting columns diverging at the top due to fault creep (the bottoms are in a common footing). External offset shown on left.

Further north the fault passes under the lengthwise midline of the football field of California Memorial Stadium at the University of California, Berkeley. Fault creep since 1923 offset the original walls at the north and south ends 13 inches (33 cm).

Extensive upgrades over a recent eighteen-month interval have addressed the life safety issues, including replacement of the football players' facilities, and an extensive seismic retrofit of those sections not subject to fault shearing. The work was the subject of several lawsuits from neighborhood and environmental groups, who were concerned about such extensive construction on top of a major fault. During the reconstruction, the Cal Bears have played at AT&T Park in San Francisco for one season. The modifications completed in Summer 2012 involved the cutting of the stadium into four independent sections, followed by the demolition of the two segments directly over the rubble zone. The north and south ends are formed of new bridging sections that rest upon floating mats (foundations that do not penetrate the surface, rather sitting upon plastic sheets over level graded gravel and sand) where they pass over and near the fault, with appropriate sliding connections between the sections for the safety of spectators and the ability to absorb the relative rotation between the east and west fixed sections and the new north and south mobile sections.

==== Electrical and communication system disruption ====
Affected areas are likely to be without electrical power for an extensive period. This in turn can make fuel supplies for vehicles and emergency generators unavailable locally and impact both domestic water, industrial water, sewage plants, and drainage pumping. Due to the extensive use of point of sale scanners and registers in supermarkets this could also impact the ability of stores to sell essential items such as groceries and to preserve frozen food items, as well as terminating cable TV and most internet access.

==== Cities affected ====
Some of the cities in the eastern bay shore and south bay region near this fault include Richmond, El Cerrito, Berkeley, Albany, Emeryville, Kensington, Oakland, Piedmont, San Leandro, San Lorenzo, Castro Valley, Hayward, Union City, Fremont, Newark, Milpitas, Niles, and portions of San Jose.

Similar dangerous soil conditions and insufficiently resistant buildings are also on the southern, western and northern boundaries of San Francisco and San Pablo bays and would also be severely affected by a major earthquake on the Hayward fault. As that portion includes the so-called Silicon Valley, the potential economic disruption due to destruction of works in progress and the dismantling of microelectronics fabrication plants could have an economic effect extending worldwide. The current estimates of the probability of a major earthquake on any of the numerous regional faults range up to 70 percent within the thirty-year period 2000–2029. A recent quiet period following many years of minor activity is considered to be particularly ominous by many, although geologists have not yet been able to predict earthquakes with any useful accuracy. They do warn that all residents of the region should be prepared for a large event and its subsequent effects (e. g., lack of water, firefighting, first aid, electricity, motor and heating fuels, etc.) and that much life-safety protective work remains to be done.

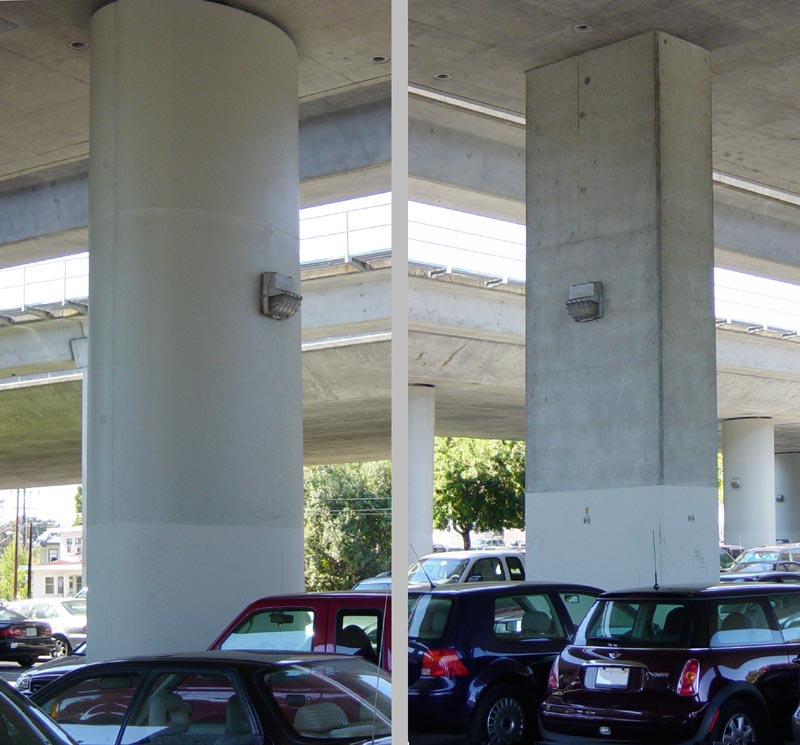
State Route 24 retrofit at the Rockridge BART Station parking lot. Jacketed and grouted column on left, unmodified on right.

=== Retrofits for survivability ===
It is primarily the likelihood of a severe earthquake on the Hayward or San Andreas faults that has spurred a substantial effort to retrofit and sometimes replace large structures at risk, particularly the eastern and western spans of the San Francisco–Oakland Bay Bridge, the San Francisco and Oakland city halls, and numerous elevated rail, road, and pedestrian structures and overpasses. Much work remains to be done in the region and progress is being hampered by budget constraints imposed by trickle down federal-state-regional deficits, design and construction delays due to state and local political bickering over design, and unexpectedly high steel and cement costs due to the extensive construction work being done in China. Nonetheless, Bay area cities and counties have long expected a major earthquake and as a result all building in the past 30 years has been required to adhere to strict guidelines regarding earthquake resistance. Of all the earthquake prone regions of the world, the San Francisco Bay Area is among the most prepared structurally for the eventuality of a major quake while remaining grossly unprepared in both civil response planning and in the retrofitting of older buildings.

== Further information ==
=== Virtual tour ===
The Google Earth website, in cooperation with the United States Geological Survey, has prepared a virtual helicopter tour of the fault, with much additional information available through the tour. Potentially dangerous landslide areas are also marked, showing great areas beyond the fault that could be rendered uninhabitable by a major event.

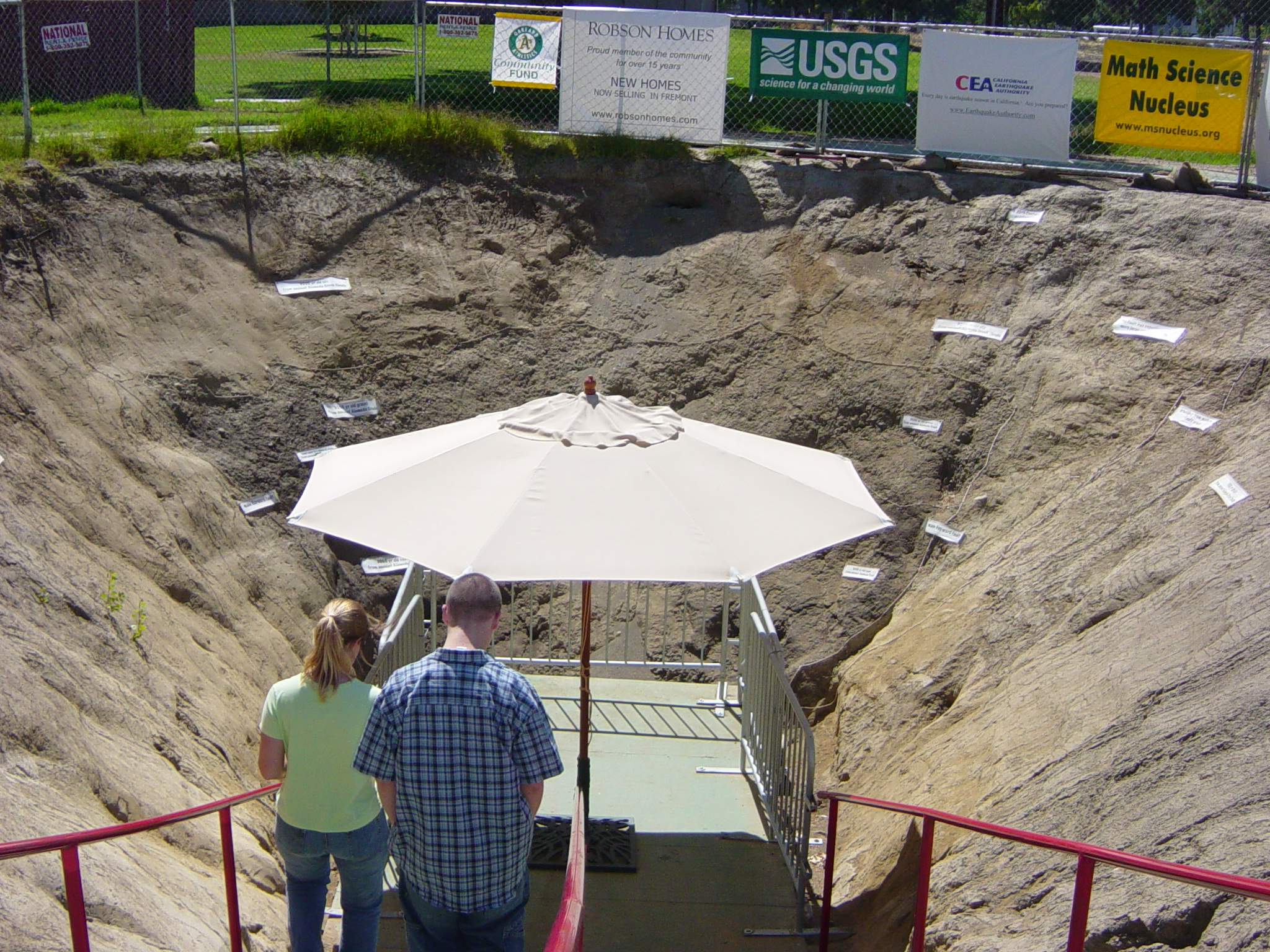
A docent leads a visitor to a viewing platform within the pit.

=== Special exhibit ===
Fremont Earthquake Exhibit: The Hayward Fault Exposed

This geotourism exhibit (April through October 2006, now closed) featured a 12–15-foot-deep (3.7–4.6 m) pit exposing the Hayward Fault, which could be viewed "face to face" from a shaded platform by descending a staircase. Significant features were noted and marked. Similar trench excavations are used in the determination of the frequency and magnitude of prehistoric earthquakes and to determine the location of latent faults as part of the science of Paleoseismology

- Extensive additional interpretive material concerning the geology and seismology of the Bay Area was presented for viewing, most of which is currently accessible online.
- Funding and organization for a permanent exhibit at this location is being actively sought, with planning in progress.
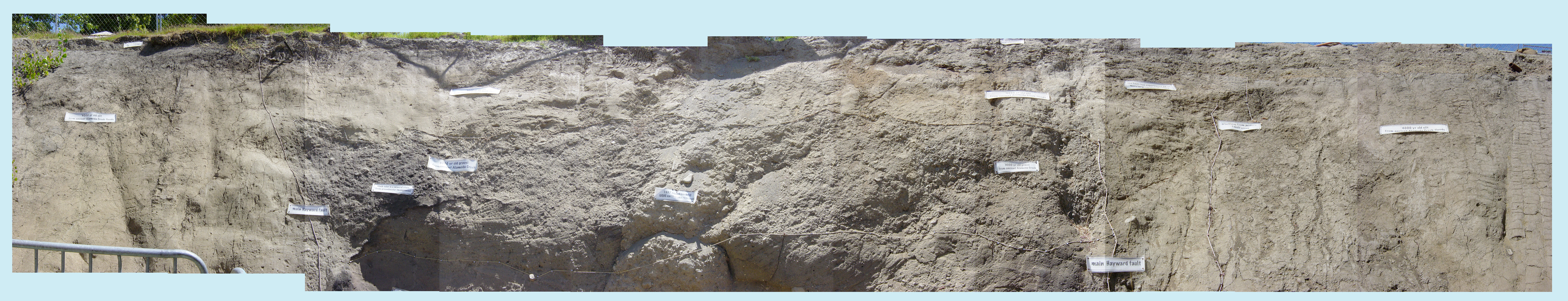
Multiple image view from the platform.
The fault has here been marked with cordage and various features labeled.
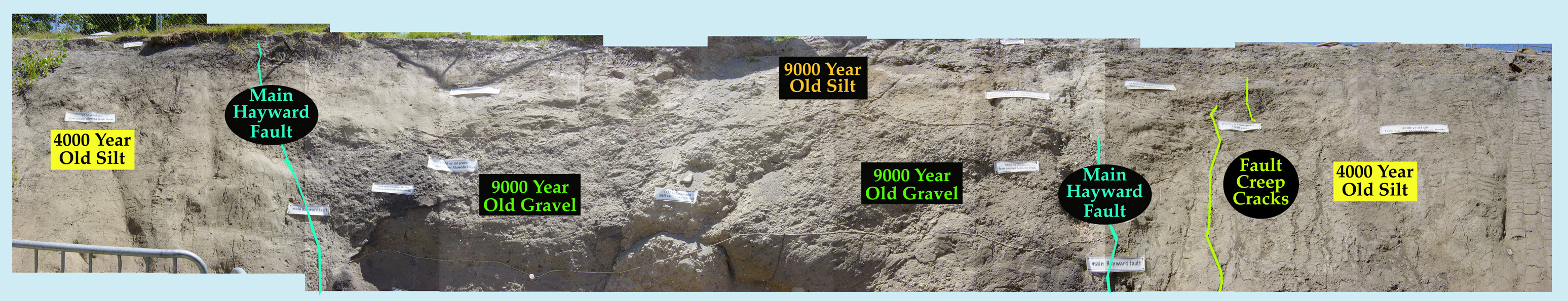
Image with enhanced annotation added

=== In popular culture ===
The Tom Wolfe novel A Man in Full features a fictional major earthquake on the Hayward Fault as a deus ex machina method (freeing a major character from prison) and plot development point.

The James Bond movie A View to a Kill (1985) involved a plot, referred as "Main Strike", by Max Zorin to detonate explosives along the Hayward Fault, San Andreas Fault and at the "geological lock" to flood the two faults with water from nearby lakes and cause both faults to move causing a "double earthquake" that would destroy Silicon Valley, all in order for Zorin to monopolize the microchip market.
