= Echelon cracks =

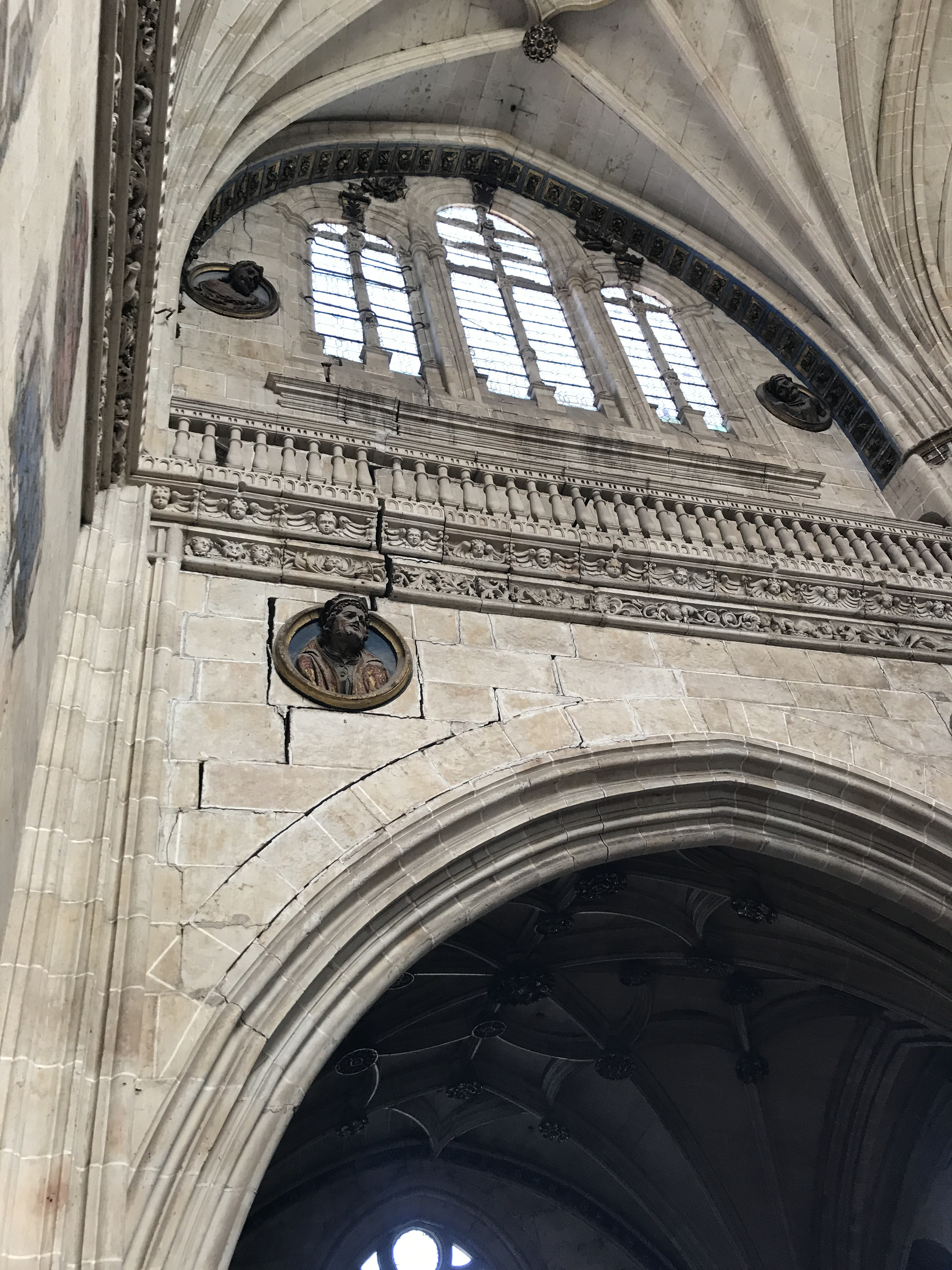
Crack in the masonry of the New Cathedral of Salamanca, a visible trace of the damage caused by the devastating 1755 Lisbon earthquake.

Echelon cracks are a related series of cracks in a planar structure and are a response to shearing forces in the plane of the surface. Such cracks are typically found in asphalt roadways due to aseismic creep and in other planar structures such as walls and building facades due to non-uniform settlement into soft soil.

Such cracks in a uniform surface will form at a uniform angle to the general direction of shear and will progress with more-or-less uniform spacing, length, and offset, thus forming the echelon.

On a larger scale, a zone between offset strike slip faults may have minor en echelon fault strands that accommodate the shearing motion induced in the region. On rock undergoing these shearing stresses en echelon veins may occur as fracture fillings.
