= Aseismic creep =

Surface displacement along a geological fault without earthquakes occurring

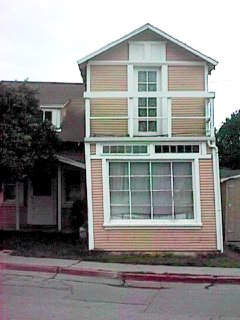
A house sitting on the Calaveras Fault in 2003. It was demolished in 2009.

In geology, aseismic creep or fault creep is measurable surface displacement along a fault in the absence of notable earthquakes. Aseismic creep may also occur as "after-slip" days to years after an earthquake. Notable examples of aseismic slip include faults in California (e.g. Calaveras Fault, Hayward Fault, and San Andreas Fault).

== Causes ==
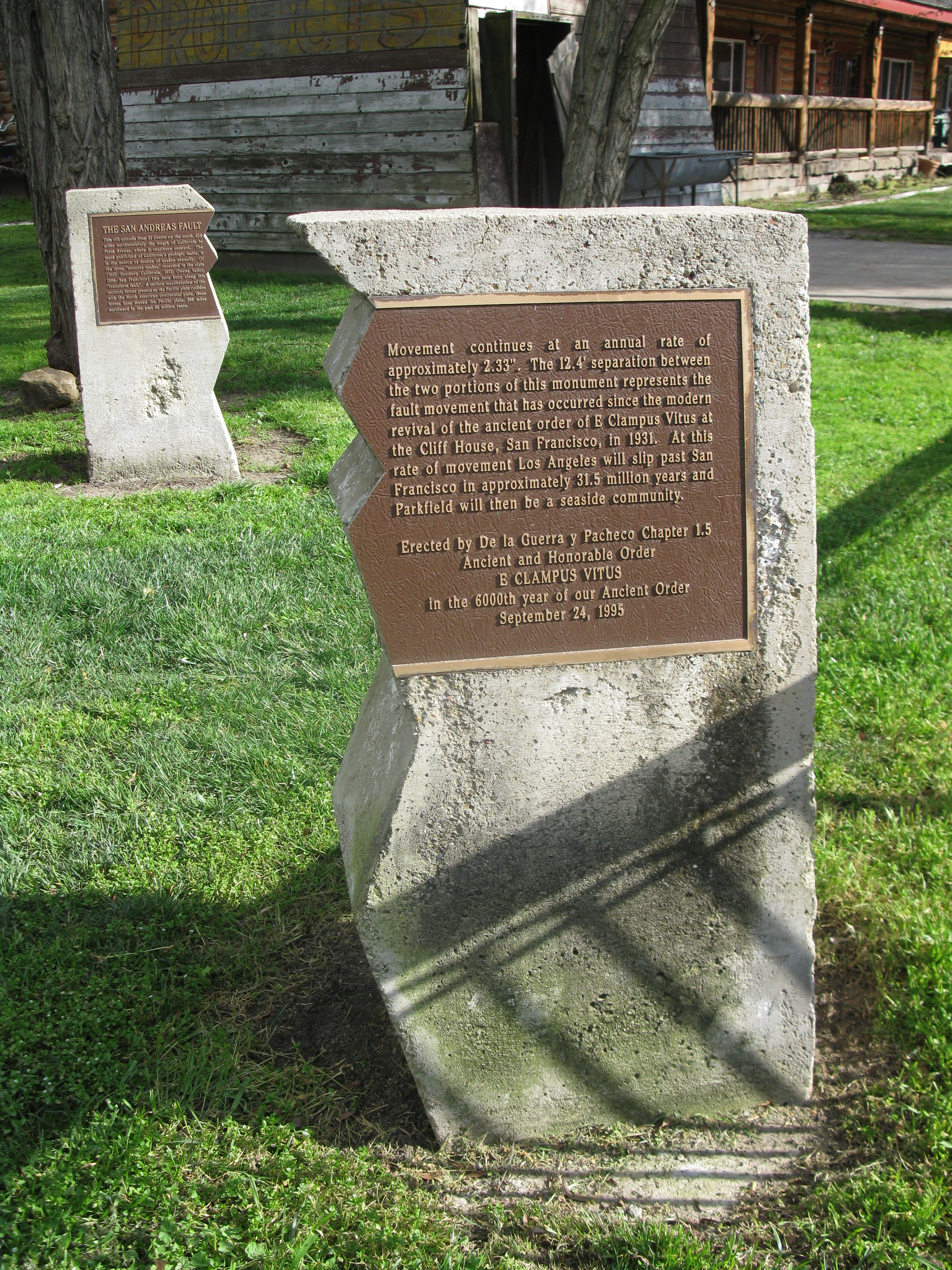
Simulation of aseismic creep in Parkfield, California. (The plaques were erected as they appear here in 1995 to represent the fault's movement since 1931.)

Aseismic creep accommodates far-field motions on localized zones of deformation at tectonic plate boundaries. The underlying causes of aseismic creep are primarily attributed to poor frictional strength of the fault, low normal stress acting on the fault in the shallow crust, and excessive pore-fluid pressures, which limit the viable amount of normal stress on a fault. The frictional reaction of geologic materials can explain the transition from seismic to aseismic deformation with depth. Friction along faults can cause sudden slips with associated stress drops (earthquakes), along with phases of no motion as stress recharges.

== Measurements ==
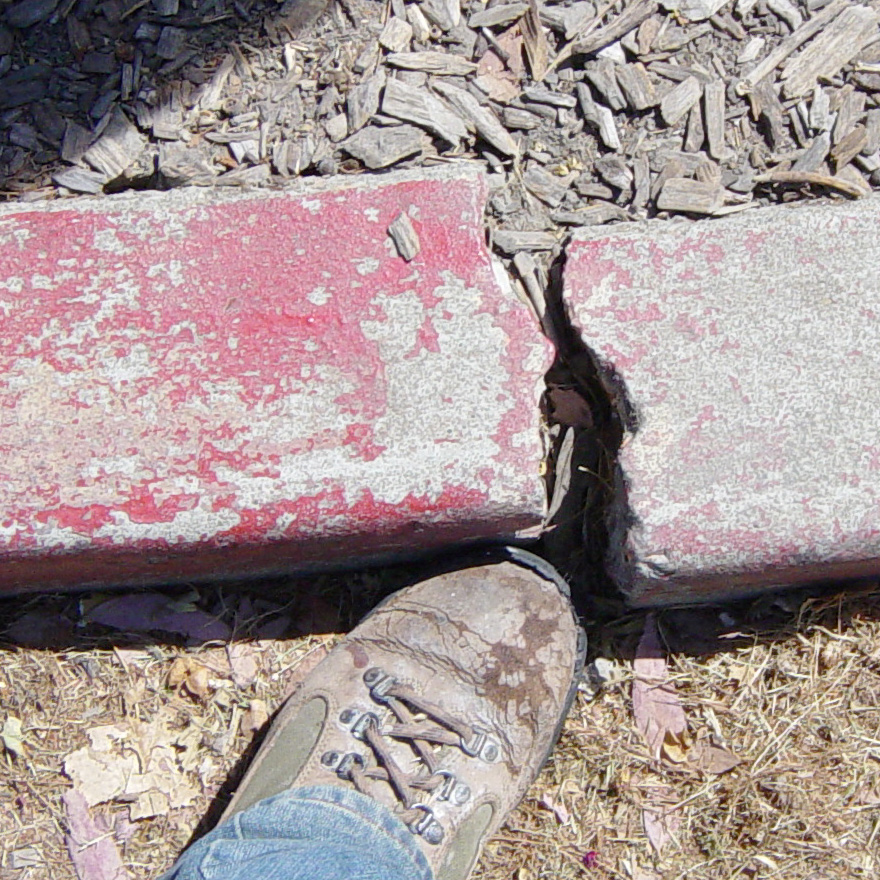
Creep of the Hayward Fault displaced this curb over 15 years (Fremont, California).

Knowing how creep rates vary temporally and spatially along faults has important implications for predicting the timing, locations, and potential sizes of future earthquakes as well as the mechanics of fault behavior. Measurements of inter-seismic strain, as well as the associated pattern of coupling, are also crucial because they reveal the pockets where stress is building up and may be released in future seismic ruptures. The emergence of space-based geodesy and newly developed remote sensing techniques are used to monitor crustal deformation in order to track aseismic creep on a fault. Theodolite surveys are used with alignment arrays to track the creep. These data may then be used to restrict a fault's seismic capacity.

== Examples ==
Aseismic creep exists along the Calaveras Fault in Hollister, California. Streets crossing the fault in Hollister show significant offset. Several houses sitting atop the fault are notably twisted, yet still habitable. The city attracts geologists and geology students almost weekly.

Other examples of faults that have experienced aseismic creep include the San Andreas Fault in California and the North Anatolian Fault in Turkey. Creep along the Maacama Fault is about 8 mm (0.31 in) per year, consistent with the steady movement along the rest of the Hayward Fault system.

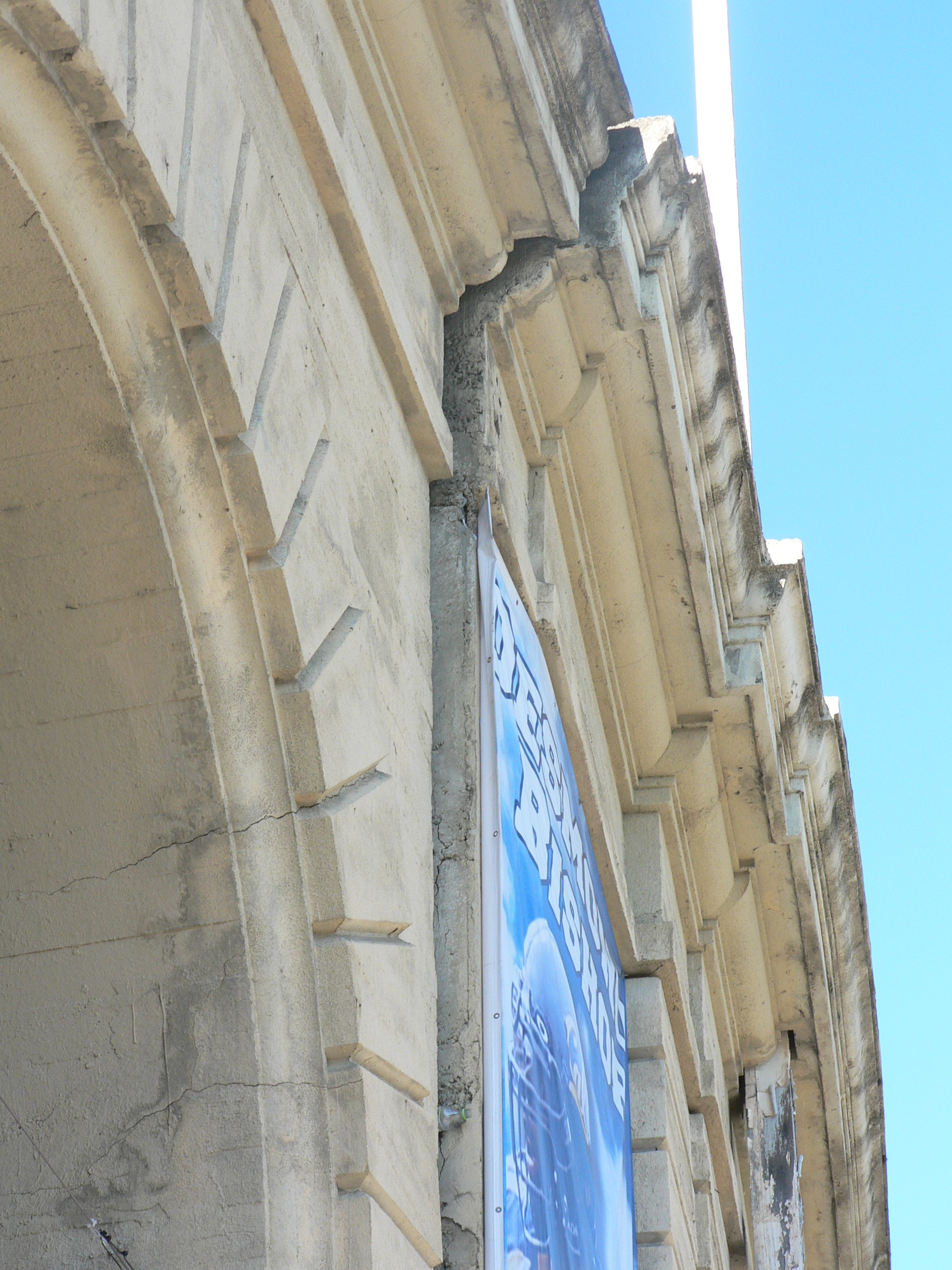
Offset in the California Memorial Stadium.

== See also ==
- Asperity (faults)
- Echelon cracks
- Hayward Fault Zone
- Maacama Fault
- Slow earthquake
- Surface rupture
