= En echelon veins =

Rock structures caused by shearing forces

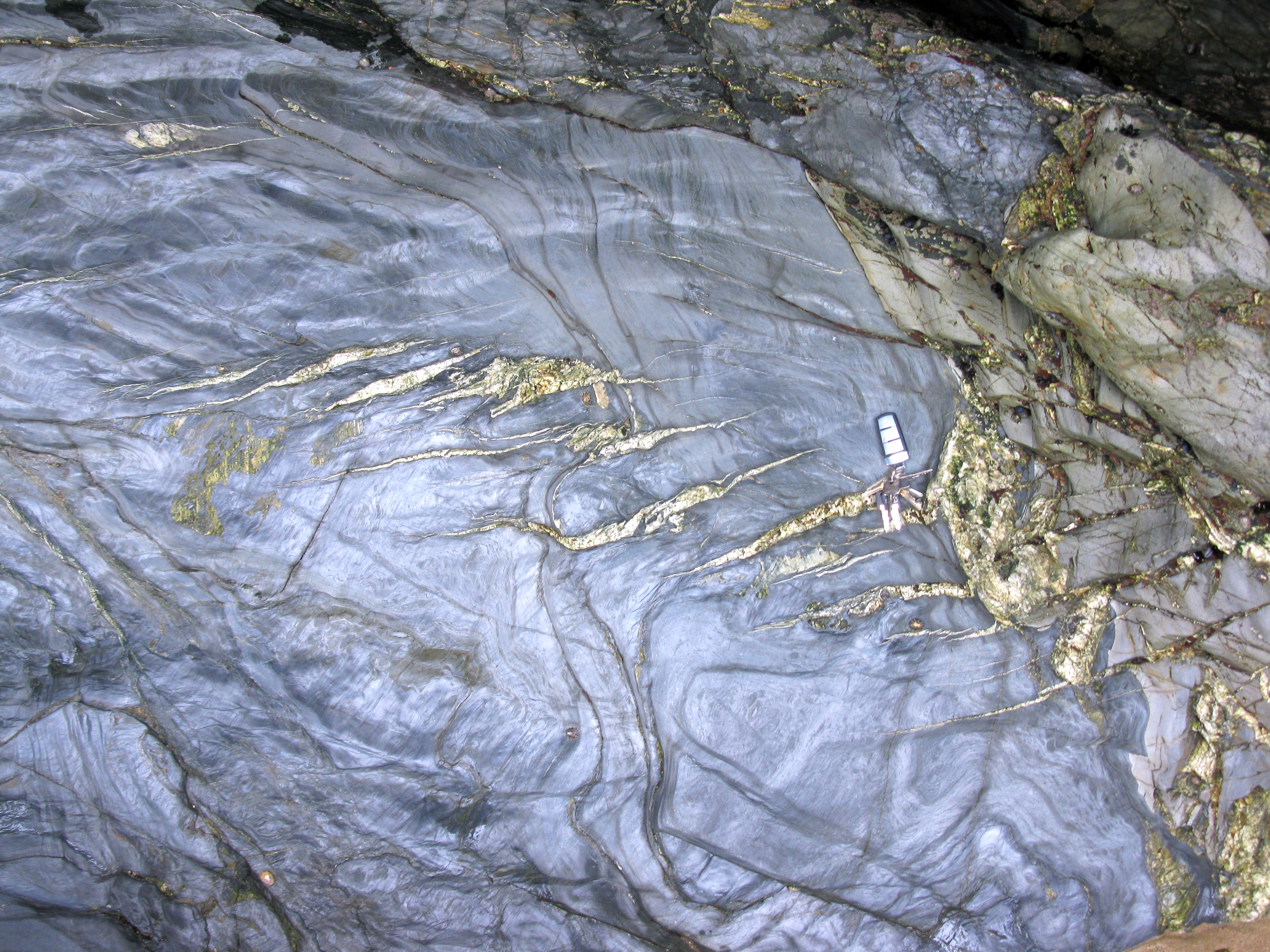
Left-lateral en échelon tension gash fractures in pelitic strata near Newquay, Cornwall, U.K. (Car key is approximately 7.5 cm long)

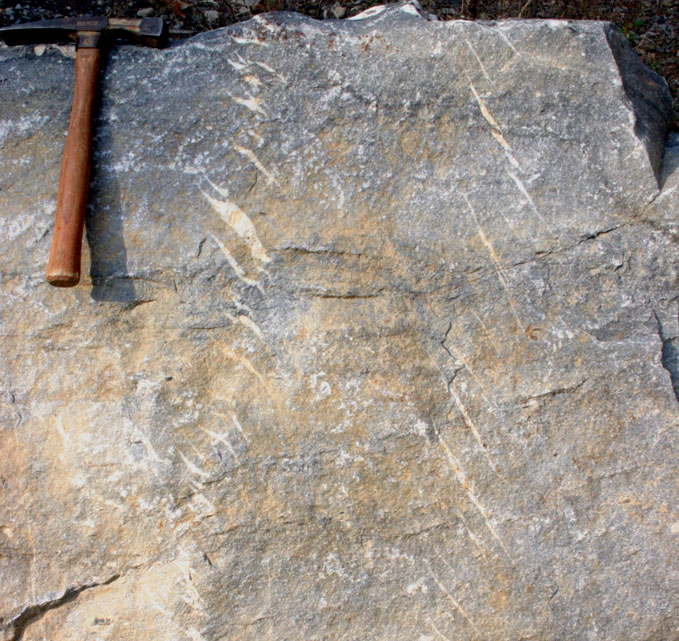
Two parallel sets of en echelon veins in sandstone near Lehigh Gap, Pennsylvania, with hammer for scale.

In structural geology, en échelon veins, "en échelon gash fractures" or "Tiger Stripes" are structures within rock caused by noncoaxial shear.

En echelon veins can be parallel or subparallel, closely-spaced, overlapping or step-like minor structural features in rock. These step-like features can be faults, or tension fractures, that are oblique to the overall structural trend. They originate as tension fractures that are parallel to the major stress orientation, σ_{1}, in a shear zone. They are subsequently filled by precipitation of a mineral, typically quartz or calcite. As soon as they form, they begin to rotate in the shear zone. Subsequent growth of the fracture therefore causes the vein to take on a sigmoidal shape. They can be used to determine the incremental kinematics of the deformation history of the rock.
