= Glossary of nautical terms =

Glossary of nautical terms may refer to:

- Glossary of nautical terms (A–L)
- Glossary of nautical terms (M–Z)
