= Landers (surname) =

Notable people (and fictional characters) surnamed Landers include:

== Arts and media ==
- Alan Landers (1940–2009), American actor
- Ann Landers, pen name of several advice columnists in the Chicago Sun-Times
- Audrey Landers (born 1956), American actress and singer
- Harry Landers (1921-2017), American character actor
- Judy Landers (born 1958), American film and television actress
- Karen Baker Landers, sound editor (also known as Karen M. Baker)
- Katie Landers, a fictional character from the Australian TV soap opera Neighbours
- Lew Landers (1901–1962), American film producer
- Muriel Landers (1921–1977), American actress, singer and dancer
- Paul Landers (born 1964), German musician
- Sean Landers (born 1962), American artist
- Tim Landers (born 1956), American musician, composer and record producer
- Todd Landers, a fictional character from the Australian TV soap opera Neighbours
- Veronica Landers, a fictional character from the US TV soap opera The Young and the Restless

== Politics ==
- David C. Landers (1801–1890), Liberal MLA in Nova Scotia
- Franklin Landers (1825–1901) was a U.S. Representative from Indiana
- George M. Landers (1813–1895), U.S. Representative from Connecticut
- Mike Landers (politician) (born 1943), a member of the Canadian House of Commons
- Patrick Landers (born 1959), Representative in the Massachusetts House, later senior VP of Lehman Brothers
- William R. Landers, member of the Mississippi House of Representatives

== Sport ==
- Andy Landers (born 1952), head coach at the University of Georgia
- Bob Landers, Australian rugby league footballer
- Cathy Landers (born 1960), former camogie player
- John Joe Landers (1907–2001), Gaelic footballer
- Mark Landers (born 1972), hurling coach and former player
- Matt Landers (born 1999), American football player
- Petra Landers (born 1962), German footballer
- Robert Landers (born 1944), American golfer
- Rodney Landers (born 1986), American football player
- Sherman Landers (1898–1994), American track
- Walt Landers, American football player
- Willi Landers, East German canoeist (active in 1960s)

== Other ==
- Edna S. Landers (1882–1952), American educator
- John Maxwell Landers (born 1952), Principal of Hertford College, Oxford
- Mary Landers, American mathematician

== Fictional characters ==
- Mary Landers from The Screaming Shadow

== See also ==
- Lander (surname)
