= Lander (surname) =

Lander is a surname. Notable people with the surname include:

- Anton Lander (born 1991), Swedish ice hockey player
- Bernard Lander (1915–2010), Founder of Touro College
- Brad Lander (born 1969), American politician
- Bruce Lander (born 1946), Judge of the Federal Court of Australia
- David Lander (1947–2020), American actor, comedian and author
- Dennis Lander (born 1993), German politician
- Eric Lander (born 1957), American professor of biology
- Frederick W. Lander (1822–1862), American engineer
- Harald Lander (1905–1971), Danish balletmaster and husband of Margot Lander
- Henry W. Lander (1826–1904), American lawyer and politician
- Jarl Lander (1944–2014), Swedish politician
- John Lander (explorer) (1807–1839), Cornish explorer
- Jasmin Lander (born 2000), Danish curler
- Jim Lander (1930–2020), American politician
- John St Helier Lander (1868–1944), British artist
- John Lander (rower) (1907–1941), British rower; gold medalist at the 1928 Summer Olympics
- Johnny Lander (fl. 1892), English footballer
- Leena Lander (born 1955), Finnish writer
- Mabel Lander (1882–1955), British pianist and teacher
- Margot Lander (1910–1961), Norwegian-born prima ballerina
- Morgan Lander (born 1982), Canadian heavy metal singer
- Ned Lander, Australian filmmaker
- Nicholas Lander, British restaurant writer and consultant
- Nicholas Sèan Lander (born 1948), Australian botanist
- Richard Lemon Lander (1804–1834), Cornish explorer of western Africa
- Sir Stephen Lander (born 1947), British security/anti-crime official
- Tim Lander (1938–2023), Canadian poet

== See also ==
- Landers (surname)
- Landor (surname)
- Lender (disambiguation)#People
