= Landor (surname) =

Landor is a surname, and may refer to:

- Arnold Henry Savage Landor (1865–1924), English painter, anthropologist and travel writer, grandson of Walter Savage Landor
- Edward Wilson Landor (1811–1878), lawyer, writer and pioneer in Western Australia
- Henry Landor (1815–1877), Western Australian settler, later medical superintendent in Ontario
- John Landor, American-British conductor
- Liliane Landor (born 1956), Lebanese-British journalist and broadcasting executive
- Robert Eyres Landor (1781–1869), English writer and clergyman, brother of Walter Savage Landor
- Rosalyn Landor (born 1958), English actress
- Walter Landor (1913–1995), German-American brand designer
- Walter Savage Landor (1775–1864), English poet

== See also ==
- Lander (surname)
