= Lender (disambiguation) =

A creditor is a party that has a claim on the services of a second party.

Lender may also refer to:

== Companies ==
- Lender's Bagels, brand of bagels

== People ==
- Elfriede Lender (1882–1974), Estonian teacher and pedagogue
- Frantz Lender (1881-1927), Russian weapons designer
- Jay Lender (born 1969), American television writer
- Marcelle Lender (1862–1926), French singer, dancer and entertainer
- Murray Lender (1930–2012), American businessman
- Voldemar Lender (1876–1939), Estonian engineer and mayor

== See also ==
- Commercial lender (disambiguation)
- Ivan Lenđer (born 1990), Serbian swimmer
- Lander (surname)
