= Sierra Nevada (ferry) =

History
- Name: 1913-: Edward T. Jeffery; -1933: Feather River; 1933-1956: Sierra Nevada
- Owner: 1913-1933: Western Pacific Railroad; 1933-1942: Southern Pacific-Golden Gate Ferries Ltd; 1942-1947: War Shipping Administration; 1947-1956: Richmond-San Rafael Ferry Company
- Operator: 1913-1933: Western Pacific Railroad; 1933-1939: Southern Pacific-Golden Gate Ferries Ltd; 1939-1940: Key System; 1942-1945: Wilmington Transportation Company; 1947-1956: Richmond-San Rafael Ferry Company
- Port of registry: San Francisco, USA
- Builder: Moore and Scott Iron Works, Oakland, CA
- Cost: $300,000
- Completed: Built: 19 July 1913
- In service: 1913
- Out of service: 1 September 1956
- Identification: Official Number: 211506
- Fate: Foundered 1978

General characteristics
- Class & type: auto/passenger ferry
- Tonnage: 1578
- Displacement: 1025
- Length: 218 ft (66 m)
- Beam: 42 ft (13 m)
- Depth: 16.6 ft (5 m)
- Installed power: Total 2,500 hp from 4 water tube boilers
- Propulsion: single screw powered by two 2-cyl compound steam engines
- Crew: 20

Sierra Nevada was a steel-hulled steam-powered passenger ferry operated on San Francisco Bay. The ferry was built for the Western Pacific Railroad as Edward T. Jeffery in 1913 and subsequently renamed Feather River. The ferry offered connecting service to San Francisco for Western Pacific train passengers arriving in Oakland, California. The ferry was sold to Southern Pacific Transportation Company when Western Pacific began using Southern Pacific's Oakland ferry facilities in May, 1933. Southern Pacific renamed the ferry Sierra Nevada and placed it in commuter service between San Francisco and Alameda, California until that route was discontinued in 1939. The ferry was leased to the Key System for the Golden Gate International Exposition on Treasure Island from 1939 through 1940. In 1942, the ferry was requisitioned by the federal government to carry shipyard workers from San Francisco to Richmond Yard 1 through World War II. The Richmond-San Rafael Ferry Company purchased the ferry in 1947 and rebuilt it to carry automobiles between Richmond and San Rafael until the Richmond–San Rafael Bridge opened on 1 September 1956. The ferry was then towed to San Pedro, Los Angeles where she sank in 1978.

In 1980, the U.S. Corps of Engineers documented the shipwreck and found the ship's propulsion system eligible for the National Register of Historic Places. The ship was then destroyed by dredging, and the propulsion system sold for scrap.
