= Walter Landor =

American designer

Walter "Joseph" Landor
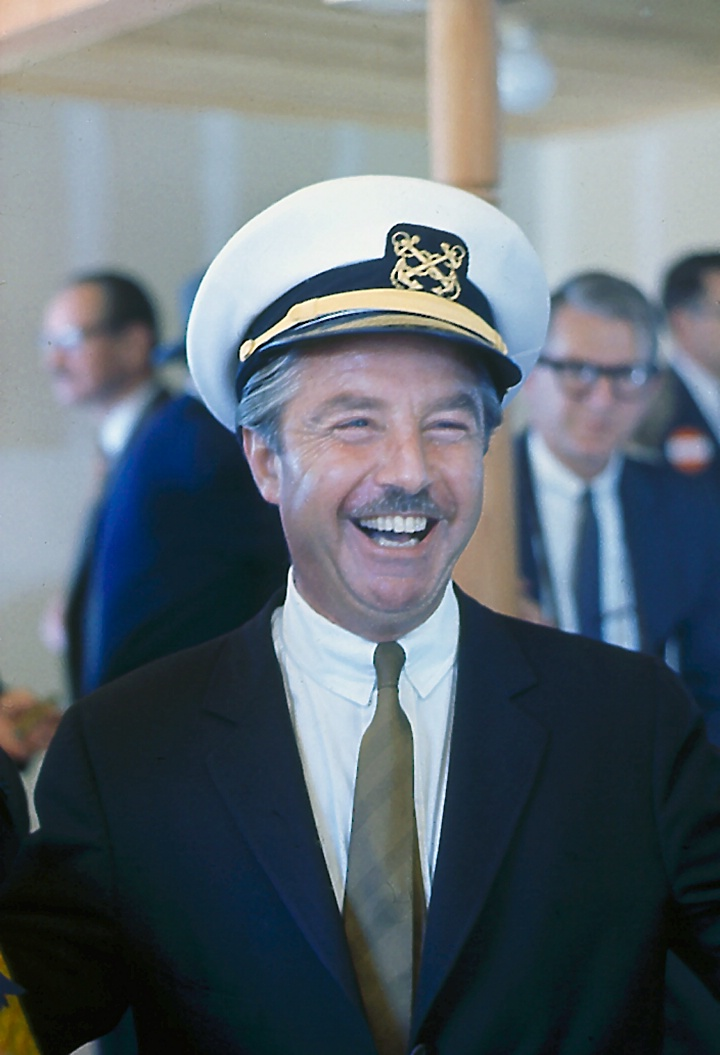
- Walter Landor in 1982
- Born: Walter Landauer; July 9, 1913; Munich, Bavaria, Germany
- Died: June 9, 1995 (aged 81); Tiburon, California, U.S.
- Occupation: designer
- Years active: 1935–1989
- Notable work: logos and designs for Sapporo (1959), Alitalia (1967), Bank of America (1969), Levi Strauss & Co. (1969), Cotton Incorporated (1971), Miller Lite (1972, packaging) Frito-Lay (1979), Iberia (1977) Coca-Cola (1985), World Wildlife Fund (1986)
- Spouse(s): Josephine (née Martinelli), m. 1940–1995, his death
- Children: 2 (Two) daughters

Walter Joseph Landor (born Walter Landauer, July 9, 1913 – June 9, 1995) was a brand designer and the founder of Landor. He was a proponent of branding and consumer research techniques widely used to this day. Landor, the company he founded as Landor Associates in 1941, has offices around the world.

== Early years ==
Landor was born to Fritz and Elsie Landauer, a Jewish family, in Munich in 1913. Fritz Landauer was a prominent architect, and Landor grew up drawing in his father's studio; he realized he wanted to study industrial design instead of architecture early on. In early life Landor's aesthetic sense was influenced by the Bauhaus and Werkbund design movements. Landor left Munich for London in 1931, studying at London University's Goldsmith College School of Art and changing his surname from Landauer to Landor. He was an intern at W. S. Crawford, Ltd in London in 1932, and decided to that he wanted to live in Britain. Following his studies at London University, Landor would help to found Industrial Design Partnership with Misha Black and Milner Gray in 1935, and one year later, the 23-year-old Landor became the youngest Fellow of the Royal Society of Arts.

In 1939 Landor traveled to the United States as part of the design team for the British Pavilion at the New York World's Fair. After the Fair, he continued west to San Francisco and quickly decided to settle there. "For me it was a city that looked out on the whole world, a city built on the cultural traditions of east and west," he later said. "How could I live anywhere else?"

Landor became associate professor of industrial design and interior architecture at the California College of Arts and Crafts in 1940. In June, Landor married the former Josephine Martinelli.

== Landor ==
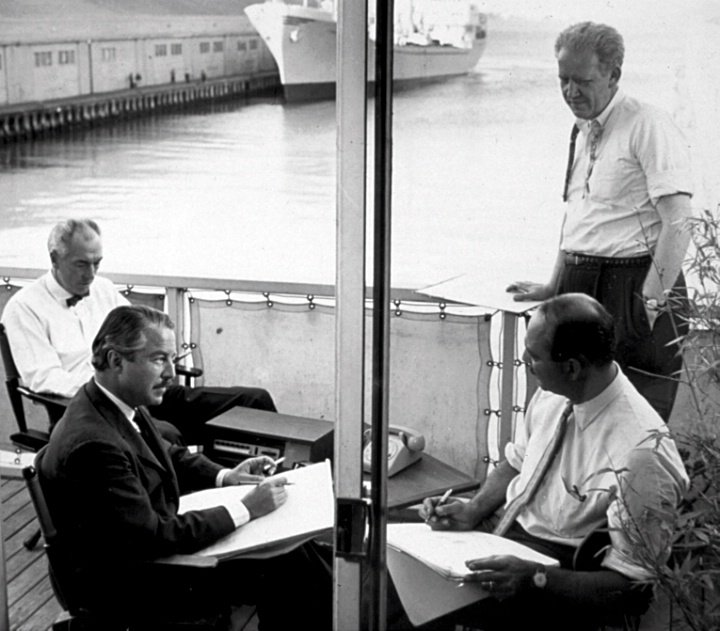
Walter Landor working on the deck of the Klamath docked in San Francisco Bay (1960s).

In 1941, Landor and his wife, Josephine, launched a design firm in their small flat, working from the living room table. Passionate about his work, he succeeded in attracting clients from a wide variety of fields, adding staff and relocating to larger offices as the need grew. In a move characteristic of his ebullient personality and original business style, Landor bought a retired ferryboat, the Klamath, in 1964 for $12,000 and converted it into his company's corporate headquarters; she had operated from 1924 to 1956, retiring after the opening of the Richmond–San Rafael Bridge. Architect Morton Rader and designer Richard Rosek were retained for the conversion, and Landor held an "open ship" party in September 1964 to mark its completion. Space on Klamath was rented to six other companies. The firm moved from Klamath to their present headquarters at 1001 Front Street in the late 1980s, but retains the Klamath as their corporate symbol, although the boat itself was purchased by Duraflame and was moved to Stockton.

What the hell is good design? Is it something that gives satisfaction to your own ego? Or is it something that creates a positive response in the eyes, minds, and hearts of millions of people? Also, is it something that is appropriate to its category? Ideally it is all of these.

— Walter Landor, unknown source

His work included brands like Del Monte (1965), Levi Strauss & Co. (1968), Virginia Slims, (1968), Cotton Incorporated (1973), Marlboro (1977), Dole Foods (1984), Coca-Cola (1985), Fujifilm (1987), and Bank of America. He also designed the corporate identities for many airlines, including Alitalia, British Airways, Garuda Indonesia, Japan Airlines, Delta Air Lines, Cathay Pacific Airways, and Singapore Airlines.

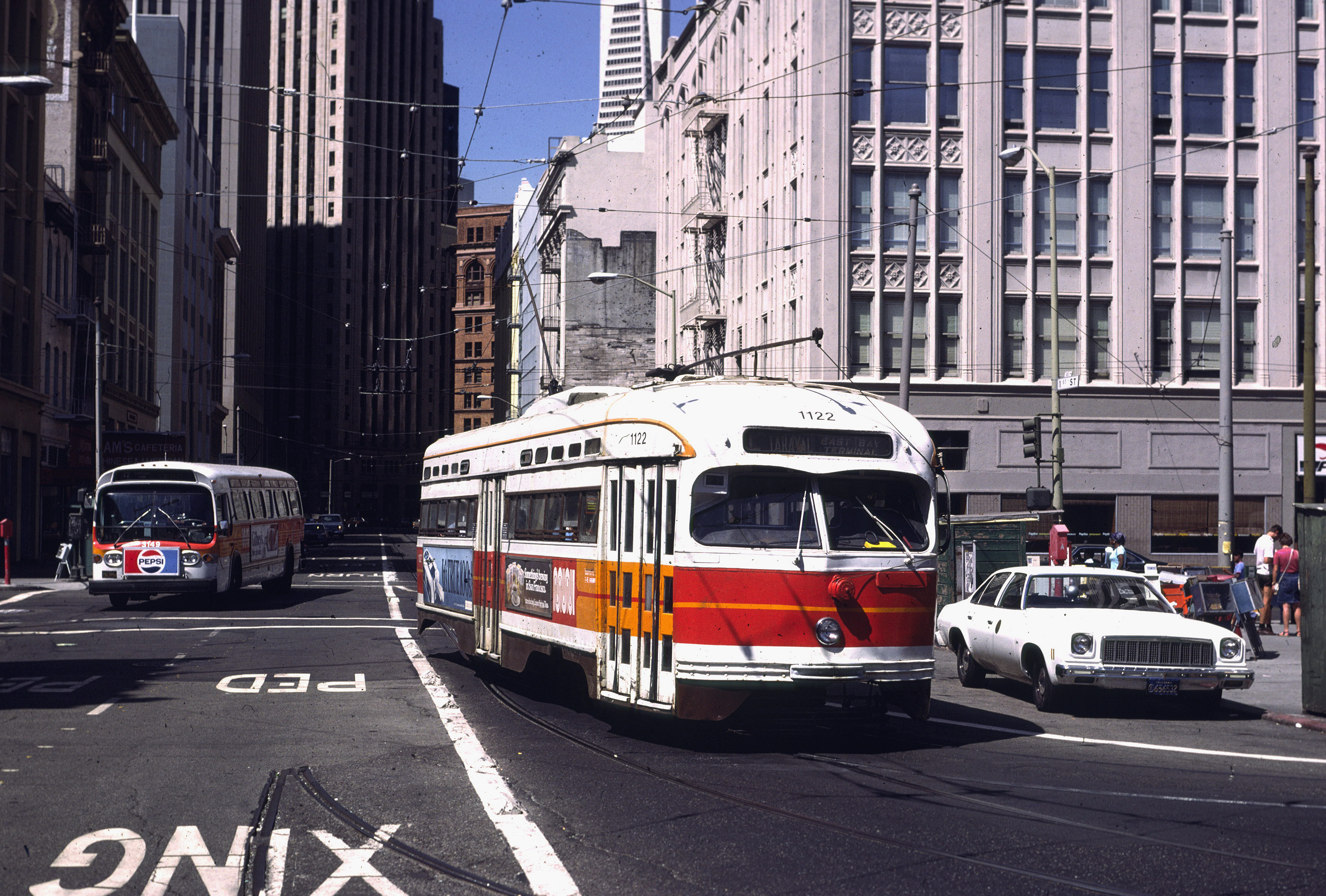
GM New Look bus and PCC streetcar (No. 1122) in San Francisco, wearing "Landor livery" in 1982.

Landor received a commission for branding San Francisco Muni, resulting in the "worm" logo and orange-and-yellow "sunset" livery for vehicles; the designs were unveiled on January 27, 1975. Although the Landor color scheme was phased out gradually starting in 1995 with the introduction of the gray-and-red Breda LRV2 light rail cars, the San Francisco Municipal Transportation Agency, which took over operation from Muni in 1999, retained the "worm" Muni logo for vehicles, despite selecting a winner in a contest in 1996 for Academy of Art College students which proposed replacing the logo with a green, silver and orange winged circle.

In 1985, Walter Landor gave the commencement address at ArtCenter College of Design (Pasadena, California), where he shared his five secrets for a successful design career; he was also presented with an honorary degree.

Landor retired in 1989. In 1994 the Smithsonian Institution honored Walter Landor by establishing a permanent collection of his designs and packaging. Landor died in 1995 at the age of 81.

== Awards and legacy ==
Landor was awarded the 2004 AIGA Medal for his contributions to the industry.

== See also ==
- Saul Bass, a contemporary graphic artist also responsible for many iconic logos
- Raymond Loewy (1893–1986), French-born American industrial designer

== Bibliography ==
Bernard F. Gallagher, senior documentation specialist at the Smithsonian National Museum of American History, wrote his masters thesis about Walter Landor: "A Brand Is Built in the Mind: Walter Landor and the Transformation of Industrial Design in the Twentieth Century", The Cooperstown Graduate Program at the State University of New York, College at Oneonta (2007). Although his thesis is not yet available online, his research informs the following three articles:

- Gallagher, Bernie. "Classics: The work and legacy of Walter Landor". Archived from the original on December 30, 2010.
- Gallagher, Bernie. "Coca-Cola: Refreshing an iconic visual identity". Archived from the original on December 30, 2010.
- Gallagher, Bernie. "Walter Landor: Portrait of a Pioneer". Archived from the original on December 30, 2010.

Other references

- Area of Design, "Walter Landor: Pioneer of the Branding Phenomena" (August 2004),
- Designers Signature, "Walter Landor"
- Kelley, Ken and Rick Clogher, "The Ultimate Image Maker", San Francisco Focus (August 1992).
- Landor
- Landor Compendium, published by Landor (2003), ISBN 0-916759-97-0.
- Meyerowitz, Daniel. "The Klamath: Landor's Icon of Innovation" (November 2007)
- Vinne, Veronique. "The Brand Named Walter Landor", Graphis, no. 321 (May–June 1999)
- Lindsay Arthur, "Industrial Designer Turns His Talents To Own Use", San Francisco Call-Bulletin (November 19, 1956).
- Allway, Audrey (September 1, 1960). "Arts of the Island: How to be Creative — An interview with Walter Landor, internationally known industrial designer". Coronado Eagle and Journal.
