= Richmond–San Rafael Ferry Company =

Ferry operator in California, US

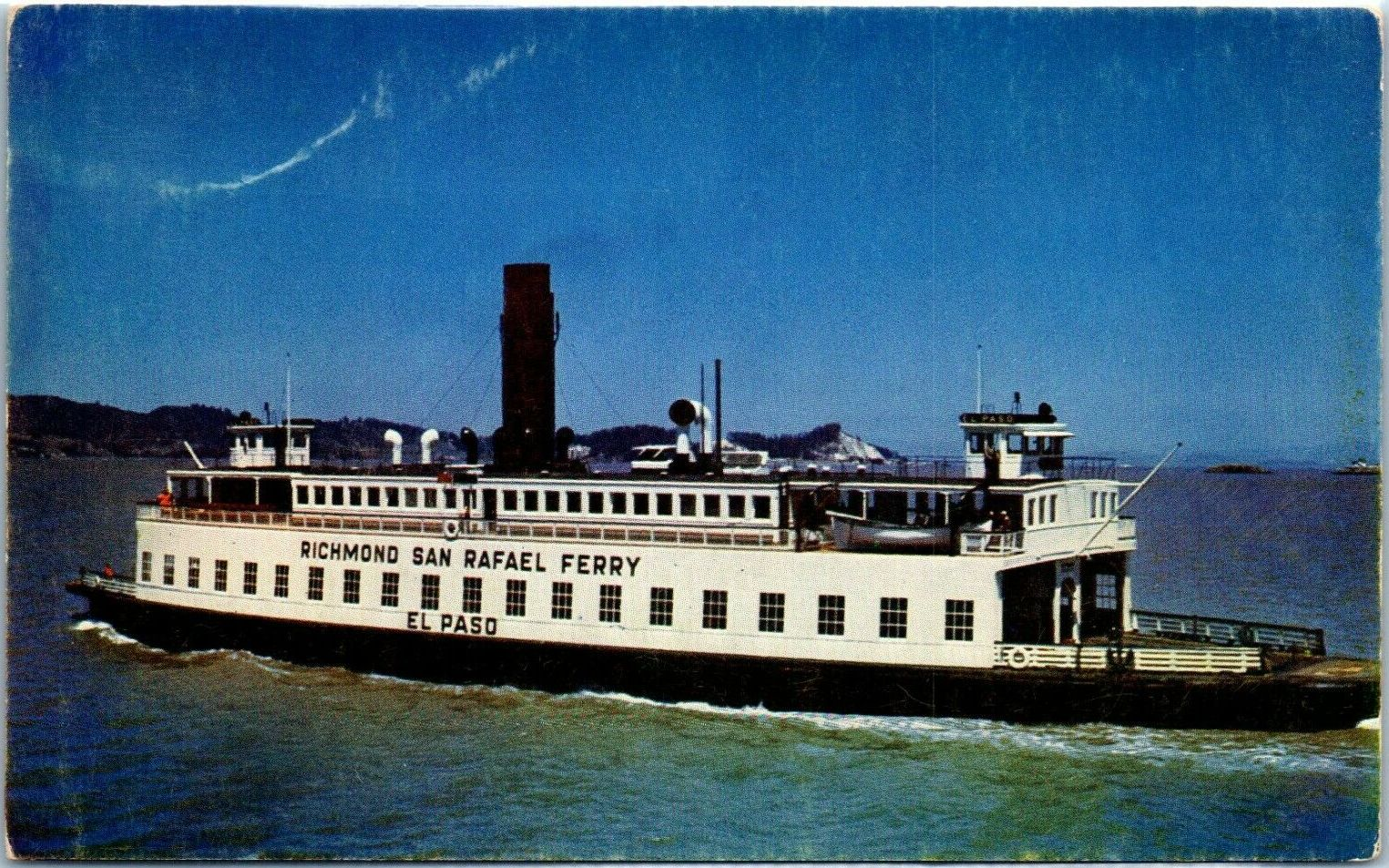
The El Paso in service around 1950

The Richmond–San Rafael Ferry Company (originally Richmond–San Rafael Ferry and Transportation Company) was a ferry service between Castro Point in Richmond in Contra Costa County and San Quentin in Marin County, California, across the San Pablo Bay. It ran from 1915 until the 1956 opening of the Richmond–San Rafael Bridge.

== History ==
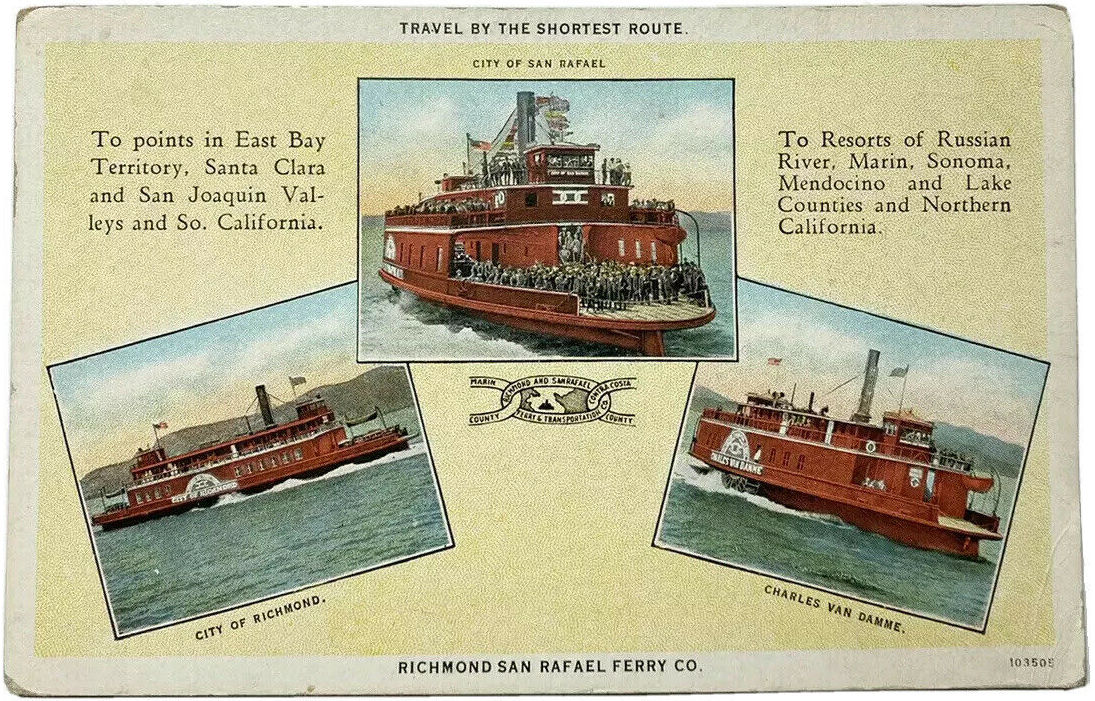
A 1920s postcard of the Charles Van Damme, City of Richmond, and City of San Rafael

The Richmond–San Rafael Ferry and Transportation Company began car ferry service on May 1, 1915, as a subsidiary of the Oliver J. Olson & Company. The Marin County terminal was the former North Pacific Coast Railroad wharf at San Quentin. The original Richmond terminal was at Point Orient. The East Shore and Suburban Railway extended its line 1/4 mile (0.40 km) from the Blake Brothers Quarry to the pier. The Richmond terminal was moved about 1/2 mile (0.80 km) west to Castro Point in 1924. The streetcar line was again extended, while the Richmond Belt Railway was extended south from Winehaven to the pier. Ferry service ran until the night of August 31–September 1, 1956, when the Richmond–San Rafael Bridge opened at midnight.

== Ferries ==
Service originally began with a rented ferry, the Ellen. A new ferry, the Charles Van Damme, began operating most service in 1916. It was named for the financier of the venture, an uncle of one of the founders. The Charles Van Damme was joined by the City of Richmond in 1921 and the City of San Rafael in 1924. All three were built by James Robertson of Benicia. The secondhand Sonoma Valley entered service in 1927, with the Charles Van Damme relegated to secondary use. It ran between Vallejo and Mare Island in the late 1930s, and between Martinez and Benicia from 1943 to 1956.

=== Ex-Southern Pacific ferries ===
Class overview
- Builders: Bethlehem Steel, San Francisco
- Operators: 1924–1938: Southern Pacific Transportation Company; 1938–1956: Richmond–San Rafael Ferry Company
- Built: 1924
- In service: 1924–1956
- Building: 3
- Completed: 3
- Retired: 3

General characteristics
- Type: auto/automobile ferry
- Tonnage: gross tonnage: 1,952; net tonnage: 925
- Length: 234 ft (71.3 m)
- Beam: 45 ft (13.7 m)
- Depth: 17 ft (5.2 m)
- Installed power: Total 1,300 hp (970 kW) from 3 water tube boilers
- Propulsion: 3-cylinder triple-expansion engine powering a single screw
- Capacity: 78 vehicles
- Crew: 13

Richmond–San Francisco Transportation Company was formed to establish a ferry route between those two cities and ordered three ferries for that purpose. Southern Pacific Transportation Company purchased the new company before it began operations and integrated the route into its San Francisco Bay transportation system. The three new ferries were among the most modern on the bay, and were used on many routes during the peak and declining years of San Francisco Bay ferry service. Richmond–San Rafael Ferry Company purchased the ferries in 1938, and Southern Pacific discontinued ferry service to Richmond in 1939. A fourth ferry, Sierra Nevada, was purchased from Southern Pacific in 1947.

==== El Paso ====
El Paso (documentation number 224327) was launched on October 27, 1924, and delivered to Southern Pacific on 8 December. She was put into service on Southern Pacific's route between San Francisco and Oakland. El Paso collided with the Southern Pacific ferry Berkeley on the foggy morning of November 30, 1936, but neither ferry was seriously damaged. El Paso was dismantled for scrap after the Richmond–San Rafael Bridge opened in 1956.

==== New Orleans ====
New Orleans (documentation number 224347) was launched on December 10, 1924, and delivered to Southern Pacific on January 2, 1925. The new ferry inaugurated service between Richmond and San Francisco on January 15, 1925, with fares of $1.20 for a car and driver and 20 cents per rider or pedestrian. This ferry was renamed Russian River when purchased from Southern Pacific for service across San Pablo Bay, and was dismantled for scrap after the Richmond–San Rafael Bridge opened in 1956.

==== Klamath ====
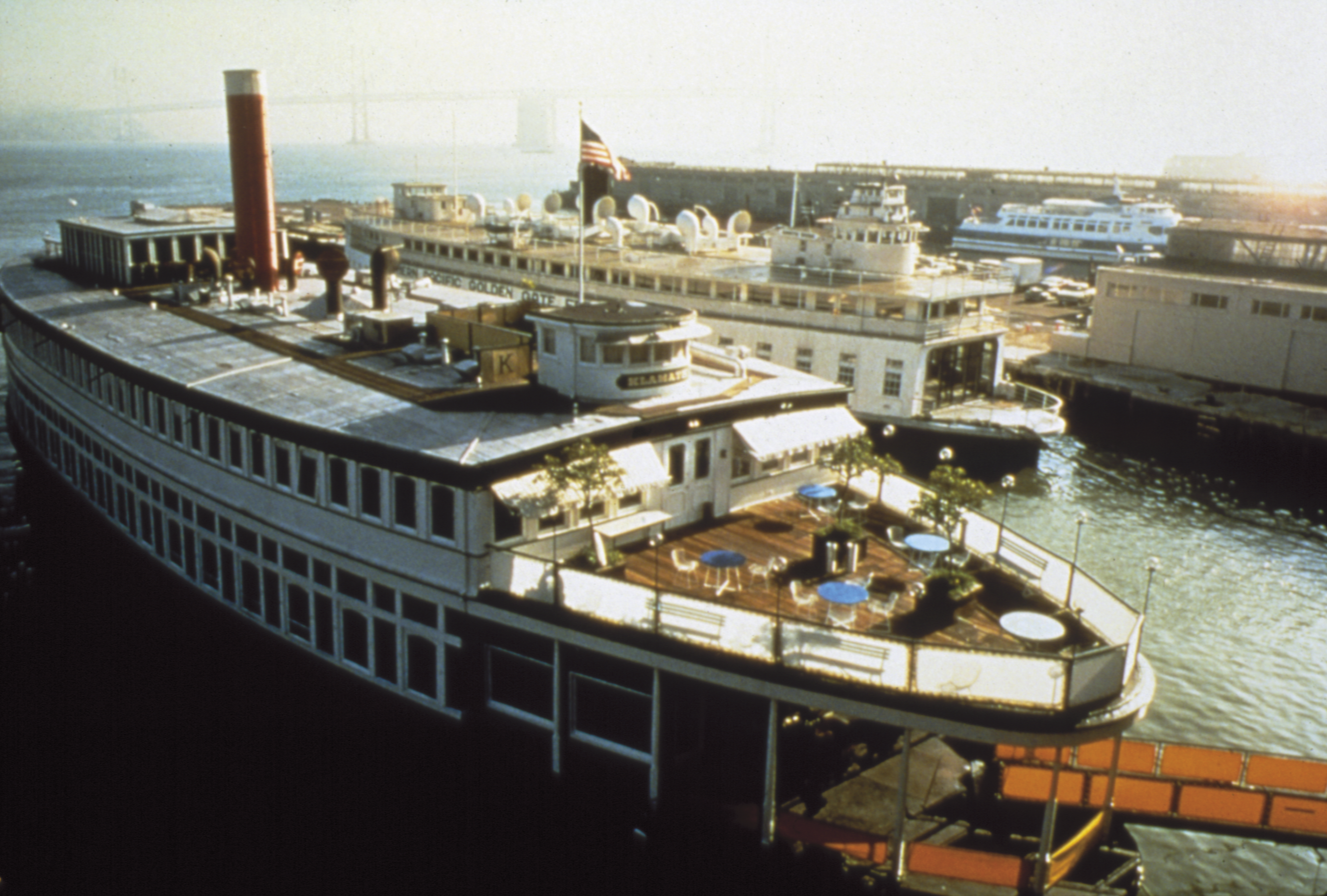
The Klamath as Landor's headquarters

A steamship ferry named for Klamath County, Oregon, it carried as many as 1,000 people and 78 cars. It was powered by a 1,400-horsepower, triple-expansion steam engine that drove two cast-iron propellers, 10 feet in diameter, one on each end. The Klamath (documentation number 224401) was launched on December 27, 1924, and delivered to Southern Pacific Railroad on January 26, 1925. The ferry ran auto routes between Oakland and the San Francisco Ferry Building until 1929, and later between Sausalito and San Francisco's Hyde Street Pier from 1929 to 1938.

With the construction of the Golden Gate and Bay bridges, ferry traffic plummeted. The boat was sold to the Richmond–San Rafael Ferry Company and carried prison inmates between Point Molate and San Quentin for 18 years (1938–1956), until the arrival of the Richmond-San Rafael Bridge, which put an end to its role as a passenger vessel in 1956.

After nearly a decade, vacant in the Oakland Estuary, Klamath was acquired at auction in 1964 by Landor, and Associates. Walter Landor had the boat refurbished and moored it at the old San Francisco Pier 5, where it served as the design firm's headquarters through the remaining 1960s, 1970s, and 1980s. During this time, it was a cultural hub for artists, musicians, actors, and writers, among them Andy Warhol, Tom Wolfe, and Marshall McLuhan.

In 1992, fire log creator Duraflame, Inc bought the ferryboat and relocated her to Ferry Harbor, a deep-water port of the Port of Stockton, docked for corporate meetings and private events. The Bay Area Council paid $1.85 million for the vessel, plus tax, and signed a 15-year lease on July 13, 2021, with the Port of San Francisco, to serve as its floating headquarters. With renovations, it was to provide about 20,000 square feet of office space totaling about 40,000 square feet along with other improvements accommodating corporate meetings and events. As the last major steamboat of its kind to operate on the bay, the vessel would also serve as a conference center and be open to the public.
