= Landor Associates =

American brand consulting firm

Landor
- Logo as Landor
- Type: Subsidiary
- Industry: Branding
- Founded: 1941; 85 years ago
- Headquarters: San Francisco, California, U.S.
- Key people: Walter Landor
- Owner: WPP plc
- Parent: WPP
- Website: landor.com

Landor is an American brand consulting firm founded in 1941 by Walter Landor, who pioneered some research, design, and consulting methods that the branding industry still uses.

Headquartered in San Francisco, the company maintains 32 offices, including China, France, Germany, India, Italy, the United Kingdom, Mexico, Singapore, Australia, Japan, South Africa, Spain, United Arab Emirates and the United States. Landor is a member of the network WPP plc, the world's largest advertising company by revenues.

Landor's work includes brand research and valuation, brand strategy and architecture, brand purpose and design, corporate identity and packaging design, innovation, naming and writing, branded experience, brand equity management, employee engagement, and digital branding.

== History ==
=== Origin ===
German immigrant Walter Landor and his wife Josephine (the original "associate") founded the company in 1941. Walter Landor intended to "...concentrate on designing everyday products that would make life more pleasant and more beautiful."

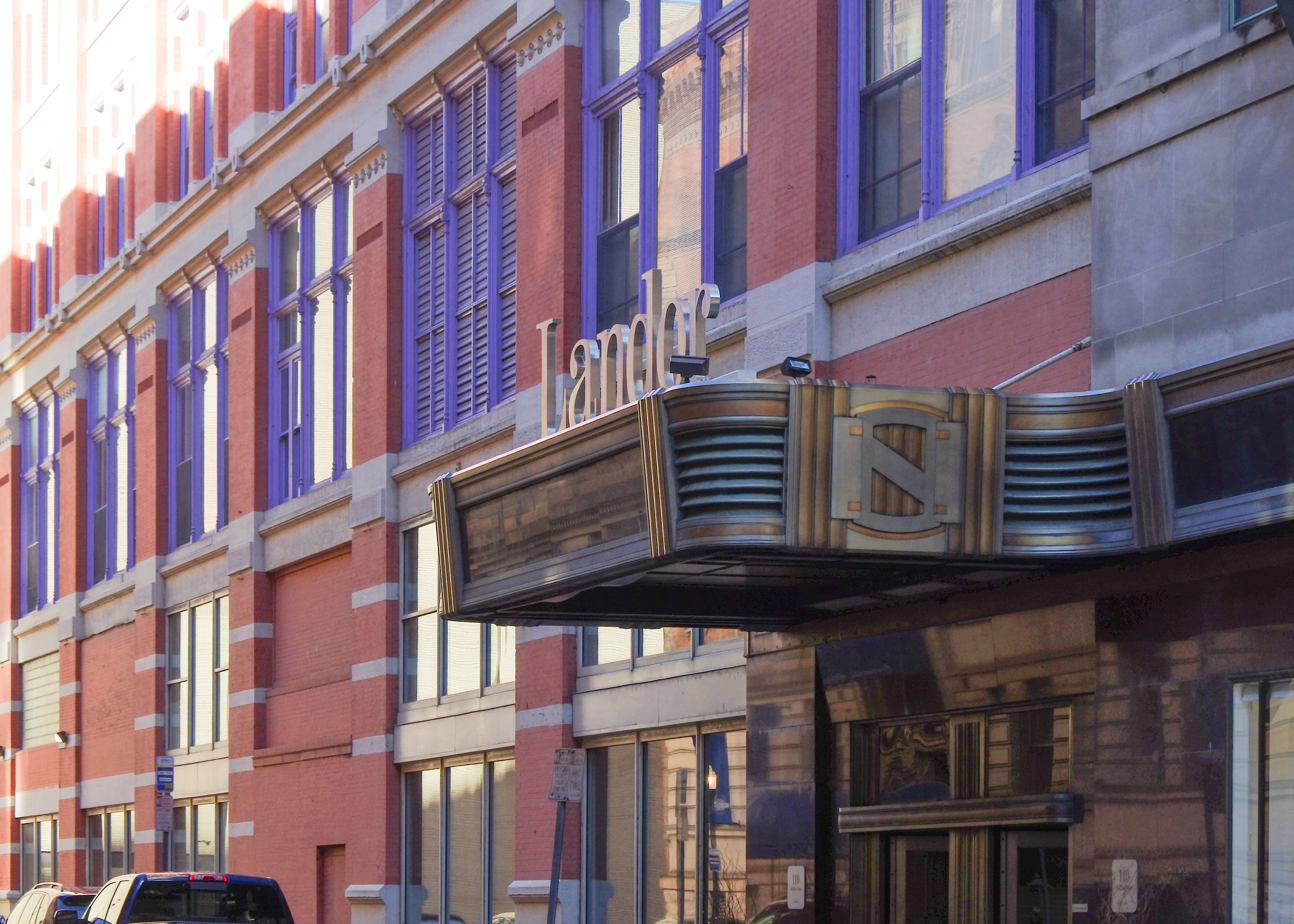
Landor offices at Shillito's Place in Cincinnati, Ohio

Some of Landor's earliest designs were beer company logos that earned awards from the Brewers Association of America and the Small Brewers Association. For Arrowhead, Landor created a tilt bottle with two flat sides that could be poured without being lifted from the table. This unique design won several awards, drew media attention, and brought additional business to the firm. It was also selected by the U.S. Department of Commerce to appear in three International Trade Fairs.

Walter Landor favoured what he felt was a client-driven approach. He was one of the first to apply consumer research to package design, and relied heavily on observing consumers in real-life situations—even soliciting in-store feedback from shoppers regarding label design. In Walter Landor's philosophy, "The package itself must do the talking."

As Landor's reputation grew, the company's client list expanded to encompass airlines, financial institutions, government agencies, hospitality services and technology firms. Over time, Landor broadened its consulting services to offer corporate and product naming, brand positioning and architecture, retail environment design, copywriting, internal brand engagement, digital branding and BrandAsset Valuator analysis, corporate identity and package design.

=== 1960s-1980s ===
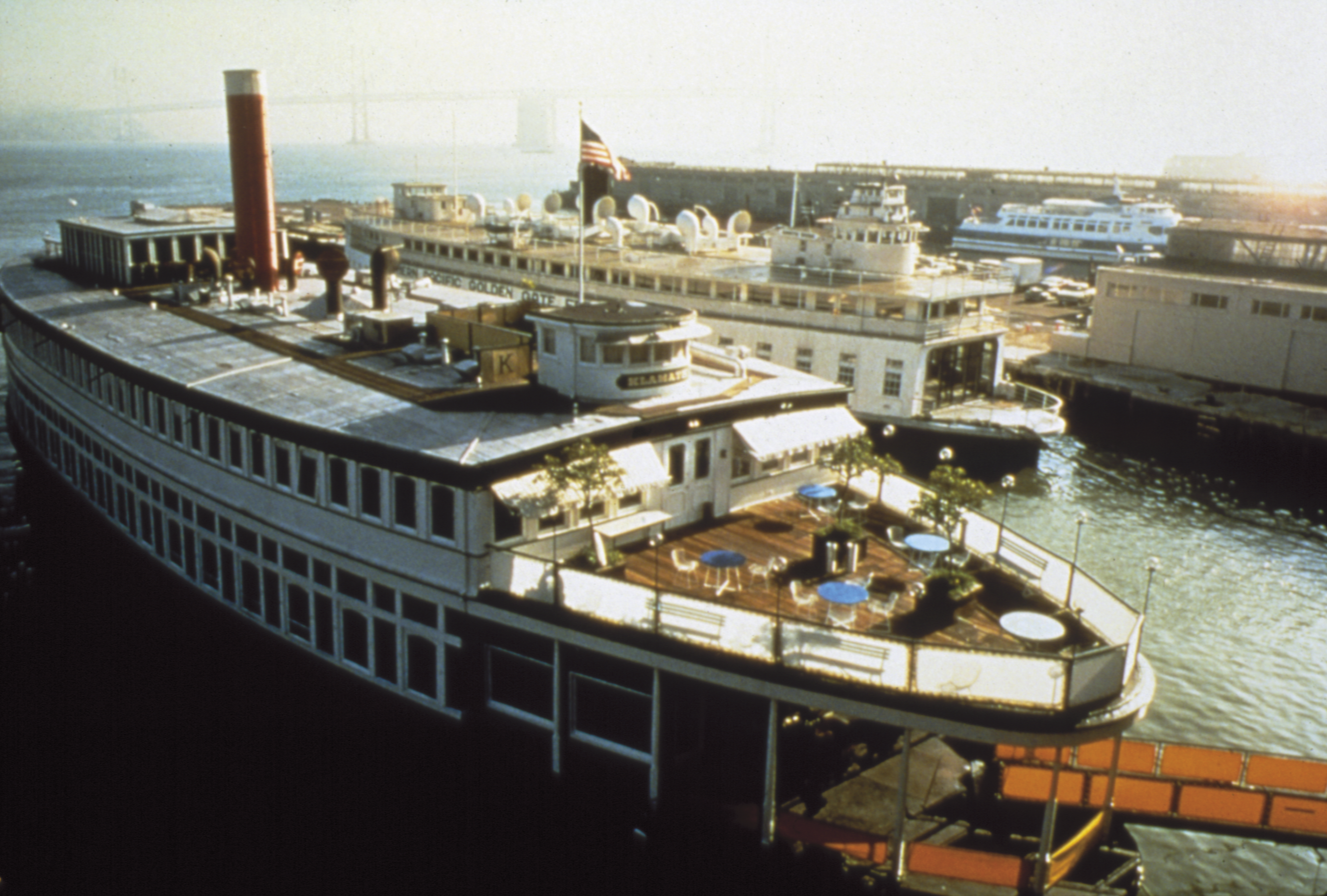
From the 1960s to the 1980s, Landor established headquarters on board a renovated ferryboat, Klamath, moored in San Francisco Bay.

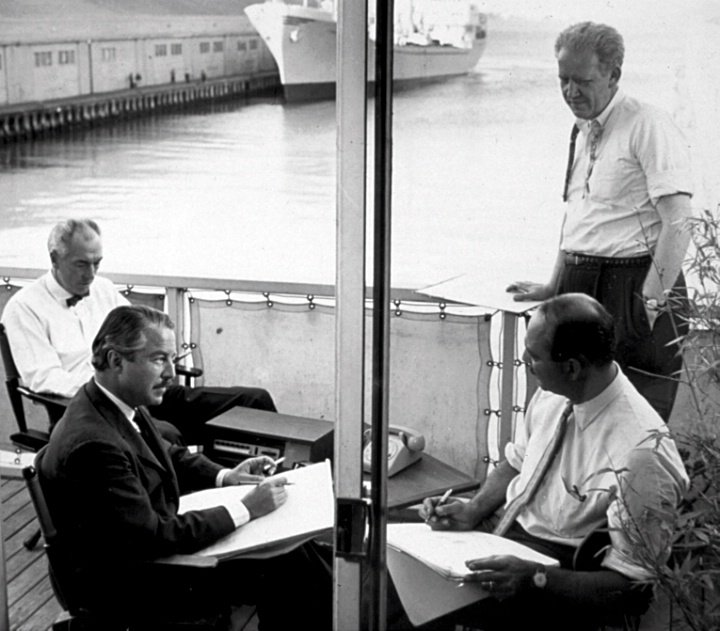
Walter Landor working on the deck of the Klamath docked in San Francisco Bay (the 1960s)

From the 1960s to the 1980s, Landor established its headquarters on board the renovated ferryboat Klamath, moored in San Francisco Bay. This unusual arrangement was intended to foster creativity among the firm's employees. Mixing business with pleasure, the Klamath also hosted business symposia, cultural events and parties that included dignitaries, artists, business tycoons and celebrities. Although Landor's business eventually outgrew the ferryboat and moved to larger offices on land, the Klamath has remained its corporate symbol.

=== Recent years ===
In 1989 the company was acquired by the advertising agency Young & Rubicam and subsequently became part of WPP Group.

In 1994, the Walter Landor/Landor Collection was established at the National Museum of American History, part of the Smithsonian Institution in Washington, D.C. The collection contains business records and personal papers belonging to Walter Landor, oral histories, and portfolio materials such as original designer notebooks.

Since 2004, Landor has published an annual survey of brand strength measured over a three-year period. The Breakaway Brands list is based on data culled from the proprietary BrandAsset Valuator and is regularly cited in business publications including Fortune magazine and Forbes.

In 2021, Landor merged with the experience design agency Fitch to form the new agency Landor & Fitch. In 2023 the company's name reverted back to Landor.
