= San Quentin, California =

Unincorporated community in California, United States

San Quentin
- Unincorporated community
- Location in California San Quentin (the United States)
- Coordinates: 37°56′29″N 122°29′06″W
- Country: United States
- State: California
- County: Marin
- Elevation: 30 ft (9 m)
- Area codes: 415/628

San Quentin (Spanish: San Quintín, meaning "St. Quentin") is a small unincorporated community in Marin County, California, United States. It is located west of Point San Quentin, at an elevation of 30 feet (9.1 meters).

== Description ==
San Quentin is adjacent to San Quentin State Prison, located just east of the prison, and is also known as San Quentin Village or Point San Quentin Village. It has 40 single-family houses and a condominium complex with 10 units, and its population is about 100.

The town was originally housing for the prison's employees and their families. Before California's effective moratorium on the death penalty in 2006, San Quentin was the only place in the state where prisoners were executed. Residents would rent their driveways to media vans during these controversial executions. Many death penalty abolitionists would also appear and demonstrate against the practice. This garnered much media attention.

== Government and infrastructure ==
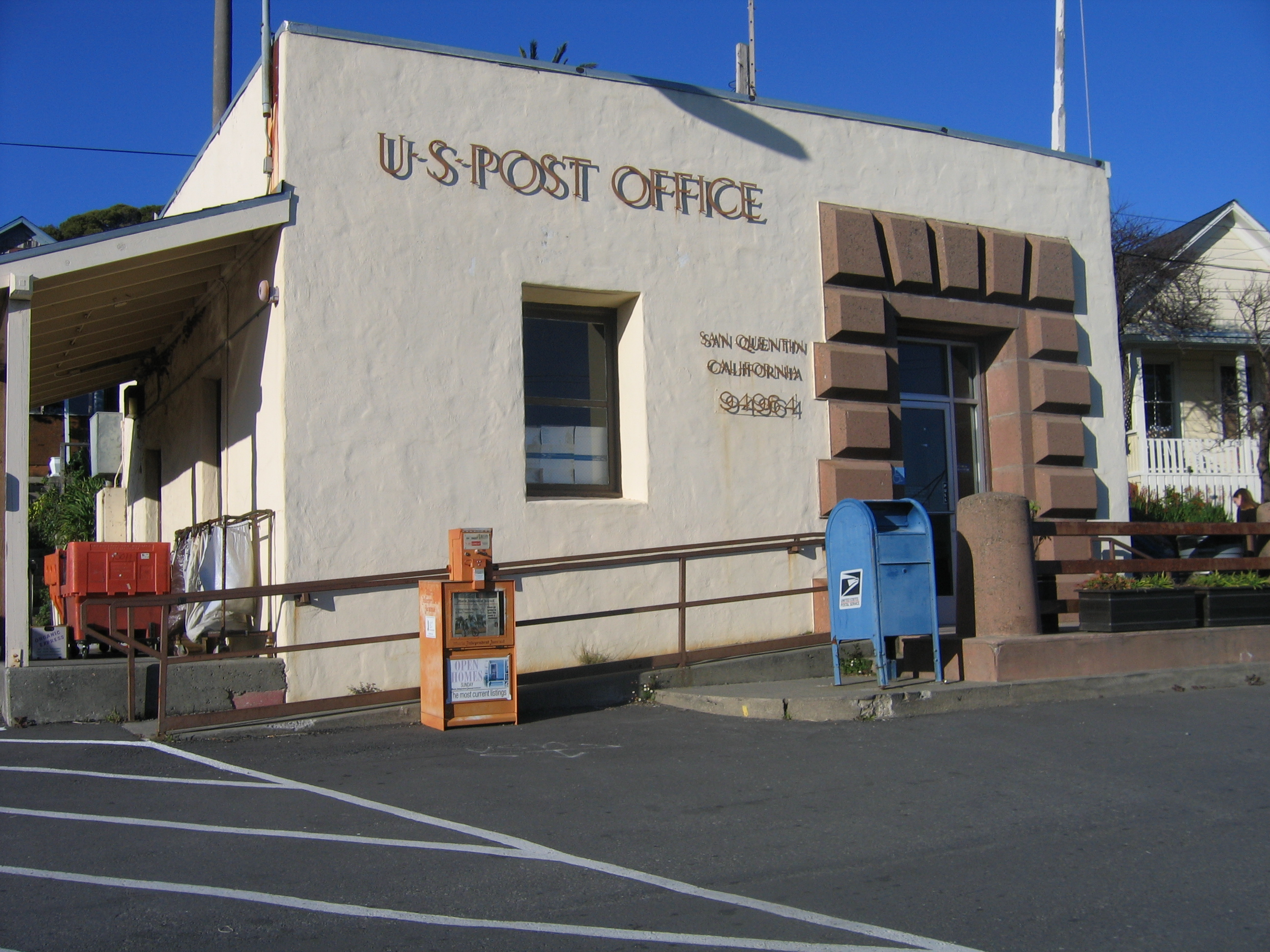
The San Quentin Post Office

The United States Postal Service operates the San Quentin Post Office. A post office operated at San Quentin for a time in 1859, and from 1862. The Tamal post office is a substation of the San Quentin post office.

In the state legislature, San Quentin is in the 3rd Senate District and in the 6th Assembly District.

Federally, San Quentin is in California's 2nd congressional district, represented by Democrat Jared Huffman.

The village is served by Golden Gate Transit route 40 between Richmond and El Cerrito del Norte BART stations across the Richmond-San Rafael Bridge in Contra Costa County and San Rafael Transit Center in downtown San Rafael. The community is in ZIP code 94964 and area codes 415 and 628. Prior to the opening of the Richmond–San Rafael Bridge in 1956, the Richmond–San Rafael Ferry Company operated car ferries between here and Castro Point in Richmond.

== Notable people ==
- Duster Mails was a Major League Baseball pitcher for the Brooklyn Robins, Cleveland Indians and St. Louis Cardinals.
