= Commercial lender =

Whilst nearly all lenders offer loans on a commercial basis the term commercial lender has differed meanings around the world.

- In much of the world and especially in the UK, the phrase commercial lender refers to a lender arranging commercial loans especially commercial mortgages. In the UK it is generally taken to refer to a lender who lends to businesses rather than individuals. i.e. a lender to commerce.
- In the US the term refers to a type of Non-conforming loan as described in this article: Commercial lender (US)
