= Edna S. Landers =

American college administrator

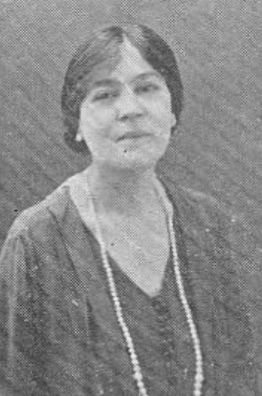
- Edna S. Landers, from the 1928 yearbook of Tuskegee Institute
- Born: Edna Amelia Spears; 1882; Florida, U.S.
- Died: October 1952 (aged 69–70); Chicago, Illinois, U.S.
- Other names: Edna Walcott
- Occupations: Dean of Women, Tuskegee Institute

Edna Amelia Spears Landers (1882 – October 1952) was an American educator and college administrator. She was Dean of Women at Tuskegee Institute from 1919 to 1935.

== Early life and education ==
Landers was born in Florida. She graduated from Tuskegee Institute in 1898, and made further studies at Teachers College, Columbia University in 1901 and 1902.

== Career ==
Landers taught history and geography at Tuskegee after she graduated from the institute. She also taught at the Tallahassee State Normal and Industrial Institute's summer program. She was Dean of Women at Tuskegee Institute from 1919 to 1935.

Landers traveled in Europe with her niece Leonie Spears Carter, wife of diplomat James Garneth Carter, in 1928. She lived in France for a year in retirement, and in Chicago. She was active in the Chicago YMCA and Tuskegee Club in the 1930s and 1940s. In 1935 she spoke at a commemoration of Booker T. Washington's life. 1944 she spoke at a Chicago banquet of Associated Women Students.

== Publications ==
- "Carrying the Gospel of Play to the Rural Community" (1924)

== Personal life ==
Spears married dentist Anderson T. Landers in 1908; their daughter died in infancy, and he died in 1917. She married again in 1947, to former Tuskegee commandant William H. Walcott; his first wife was educator Bess Bolden Walcott, who was also long associated with Tuskegee. She died in 1952, in Chicago.
