= Dennis Lander =

German politician (born 1993)

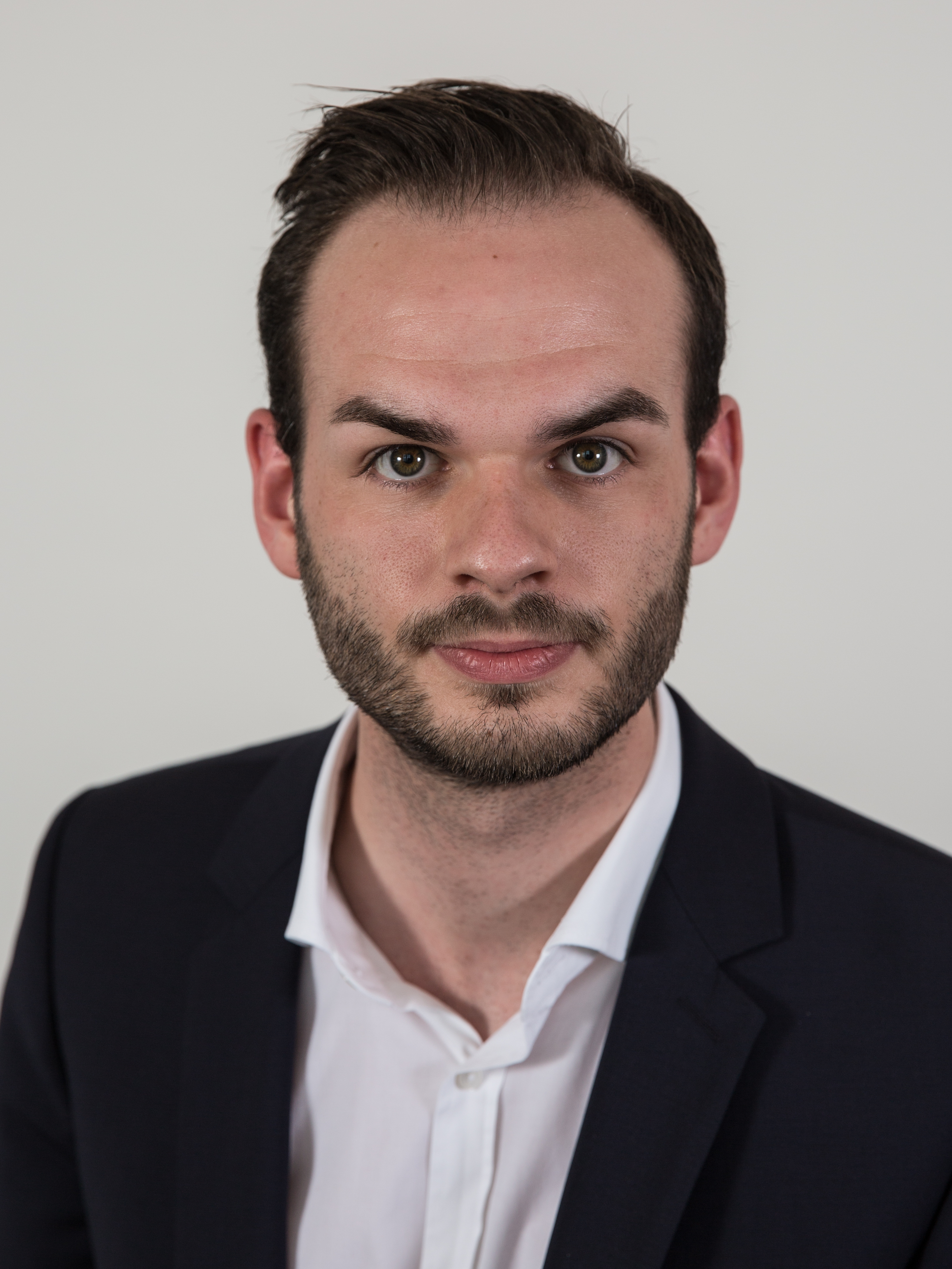
- Dennis Lander in 2017

Member of the Landtag of Saarland
- In office 2017–2022

Personal details
- Born: 7 July 1993 (age 32) Saarbrücken, Saarland
- Party: Die Linke

Dennis Marc Lander (born 7 July 1993) is a German politician from Die Linke. From 2017 to 2022 he was a member of the Landtag of Saarland.

== Biography ==
Dennis Lander lives in Saarbrücken. He attended the Christian-von-Mannlich-Gymnasium in Homburg. After graduating from high school, Lander worked as a research assistant in the forensic medicine department at the Winterberg Clinic in Saarbrücken. In the 2017 Saarland state election, the then 23-year-old was elected as the youngest member of the Landtag of Saarland. Since 2017, Lander has been the spokesperson for internal and legal policy, youth policy, and drug policy for the Left Party parliamentary group in the state parliament. He is also the chairman of the parliamentary inquiry committee investigating the handling of reports of suspected child abuse at Saarland University Hospital since October 2003, and serves as its deputy chairman. He is committed to fighting fascism and racism, upholding fundamental and civil rights, promoting economic democracy, and advocating for a politics that is not corruptible. Among other things, he calls for the legalization of cannabis and the introduction of economic democracy. He did not run for re-election in the 2022 Saarland state election.

In the Left Party, Lander was a member of the Saarbrücken district executive committee and the St. Johann local executive committee. He is now a member of the spokespersons' council of the Saarbrücken-Malstatt local branch and a member of the state spokespersons' council of the youth organization Left Youth Solid. He is also a spokesperson for the state working group on drug policy.

He was a member of the following committees in the state parliament:

- Committee on Home Affairs and Sport
- Committee on Social Affairs, Health, Women and Family
- Committee on Justice, Constitutional and Legal Affairs and Election Review
- Committee on Europe and Interregional Parliamentary Council Affairs
- Subcommittee on Data Protection and Freedom of Information
- Handling of reports of suspected child abuse cases at Saarland University Hospital since October 2003

== Social functions ==
- Member of the state spokesperson council of the Left Youth Solid
- Spokesperson for the State Working Group on Drug Policy in the Left Party
- Member of Victim Support Association and Amnesty International
- Supporting member of the Peter Imandt Society and the Rosa Luxemburg Society
