= Tim Lander =

Canadian poet (1938–2023)

Tim Lander (26 February 1938 – 20 August 2023) was a Canadian poet.

== Life and career ==
Born in Surrey, England, he studied at the University of London. In 1964, Lander emigrated to Canada. He lived primarily in Vancouver, where he began publishing chapbooks of his poetry.

Poet and scholar Gregory Betts's monograph Finding Nothing noted Lander as "the street poet who self-published countless chapbooks and sold them himself during the 1960s." Lander contributed to the 1974 anthology 5 B.C. Poets, published by the Poem Company. The Vancouver Poetry Co-op (active from 1973 to 1975), which emerged from a weekly group hosted at Vancouver Public Library, included a core group of poets and a total of around 40 members including Lander.

Lander lived in Nanaimo, British Columbia. Lander used to be seen regularly playing a penny-whistle in front of the Regional Library branch at the Krall space (downtown Nanaimo) until his accident in 2021 where he moved to an assisted living facility. He used to survive by selling his poetry and enjoyed the generosity of verbal exchange with passers-by.

Lander was one of 39 candidates for Nanaimo city council seats in the 2005 election. He came into conflict with the city in 2007 and 2008. The city council in early 2008 declared his home, which he had been keeping open to homeless people for the past years, to be a "nuisance property".

Lander died on 20 August 2023, at the age of 85.

== Bibliography ==
- The Ghosts of the City (1991)
- Street Heart Poems (1993)
- Pecunia Non Olet (1997)
- The Glass Book: Poems (1999)
- The Book of Prejudices (2002)
- Inappropriate Behaviour (2006)
- Old Man Zine
