= William R. Landers =

State legislator in Mississippi

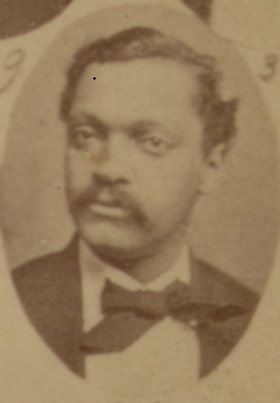

William R. Landers was a state legislator in Mississippi. He represented Jefferson County, Mississippi in the Mississippi House of Representatives from 1872 to 1876.

In 1873 he was appointed an officer in the state militia. He opposed the privilege tax bill.

== See also ==
- African American officeholders from the end of the Civil War until before 1900
