= Petra Landers =

German footballer

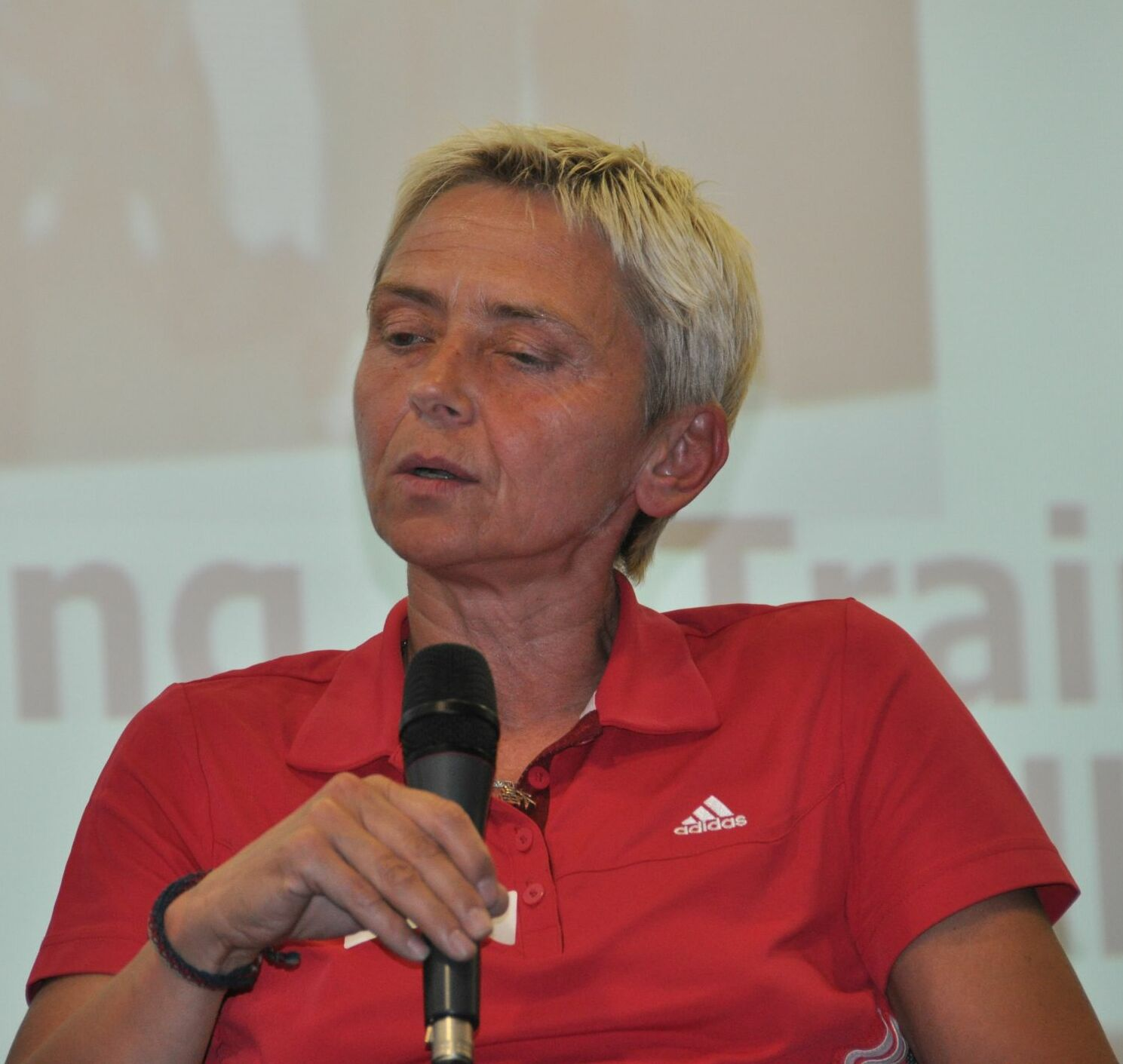
- Landers in 2011

Personal information
- Date of birth: 16 January 1962 (age 64)
- Position: Defender

International career
Years	Team	Apps	(Gls)
- Germany

Petra Landers (born 16 January 1962) is a German women's international footballer who played as a defender.

== Background ==
=== Football career ===
Petra Landers started playing in a female team when she was 13. She was playing for SSG 09 Bergisch Gladbach, the most awarded female club of Germany.

In 1981, she played for the then unofficial West Germany national team (SV Bergisch Gladbach 09 was chosen for that purpose) for the unofficial world championship in Taiwan, at a time when no official team nor competition existed. She was a member of the West Germany then Germany women's national football team from 1982 to 1991. She was part of the team at the 1989 European Competition for Women's Football, which won the title for the first time. Each member of the women's team received a tea-set as a prize from the Deutscher Fußball-Bund.

She was nominated among three football coaches to become German football ambassador 2019, but Jürgen Klopp was chosen.

=== Social activities ===
Petra Landers is a women's football activist and works against discrimination in this sport. In this regard, she played in 2017 "in a game near the summit of Mount Kilimanjaro in Tanzania, which holds the record for the highest match above sea level". This game was organised by the Equal Playing Field, a grassroots, non-profit initiative to challenge gender inequality in sport. It achieved the Guinness World Record for the highest ever football match.

She is a volunteer coach and mentor for girls in Lebanon, from 2012 to 2014, then in Zambia.

== Legacy ==
In 2022, Petra featured in the exhibition Goal Power! Women's Football 1894-2022 at Brighton Museum. Pieces from her tea-set, photographs and her national shirts from 1984 and 1989 were on display. Petra was interviewed by a group of young people, where she spoke about her life in football and plans to set up a mobile soccer academy in Ghana.
