= Richmond–San Rafael Bridge =

Bridge crossing the San Francisco Bay

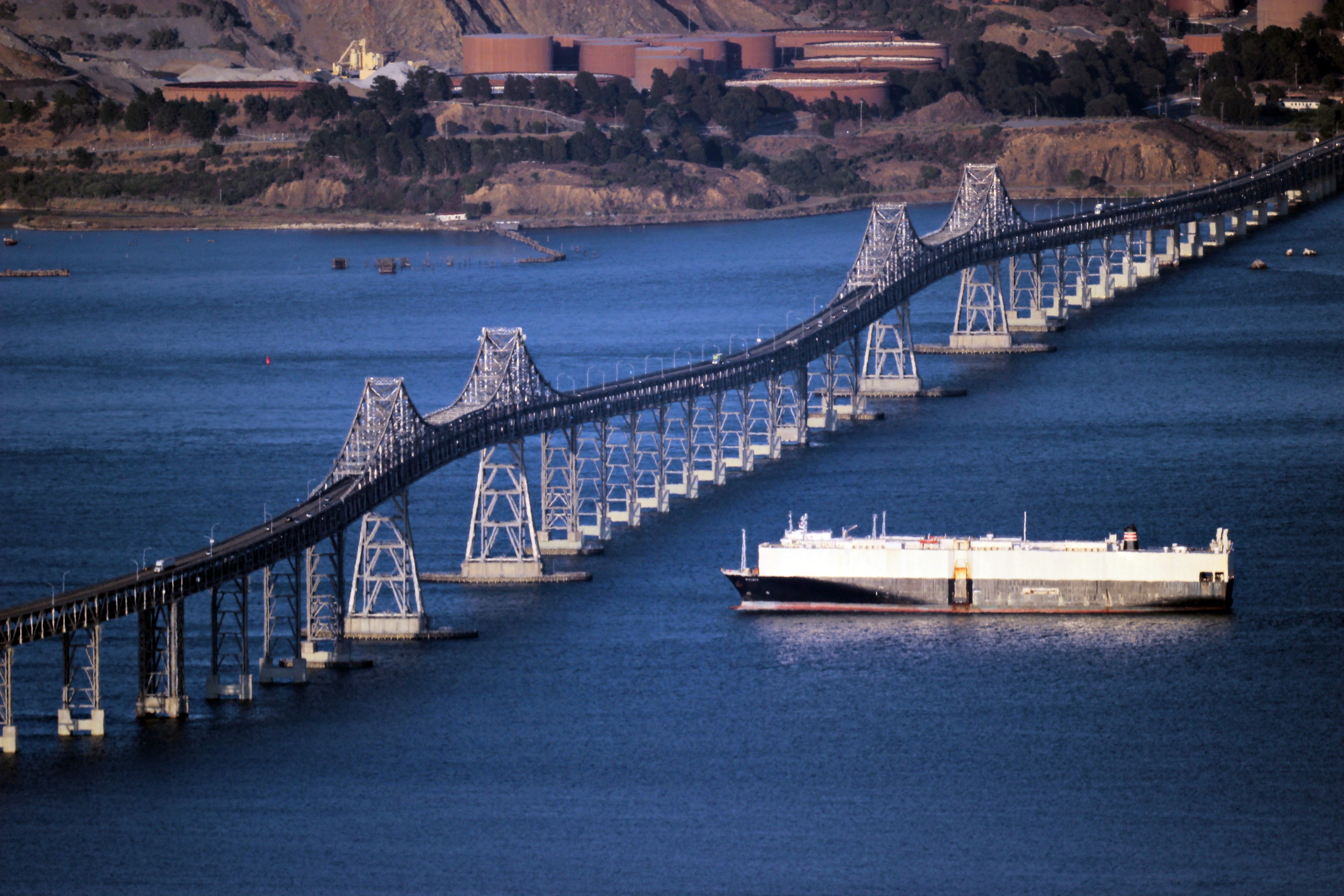
- The Richmond–San Rafael Bridge, as seen from Mount Tamalpais, 2012
- Coordinates: 37.9347°N 122.4338°W
- Carries: 4–5 lanes (2 upper deck, 2 lower deck during non-peak hours, 3 lower deck during peak hours) of I-580; Bicycles and pedestrians (upper-deck path open Thursday 2:00 p.m. through Sunday 11:00 p.m.; shuttle service during closure periods)
- Crosses: San Francisco Bay
- Locale: San Rafael and Richmond, California
- Official name: John F. McCarthy Memorial Bridge
- Other name(s): Richmond Bridge; San Rafael Bridge
- Named for: John F. McCarthy
- Owner: State of California
- Maintained by: California Department of Transportation and the Bay Area Toll Authority
- ID number: 28 0100

Characteristics
- Design: Double-Decked Dual Cantilever bridge with Pratt Truss Approach
- Total length: 29,040 ft (5.500 mi; 8.85 km)
- Longest span: 326 m (1,070 ft) cantilever structure
- No. of spans: 77 in total, consisting of: 19 girder spans (west); 14 truss spans (west); 3 spans (western cantilever); 9 truss spans (center); 3 spans (eastern cantilever); 12 truss spans (east) 17 girder spans (east)
- Piers in water: 70
- Clearance below: 185 feet (56 m) (main channel); 135 feet (41 m) (secondary channel)

History
- Designer: Norman Raab
- Constructed by: Gerwick—Kiewit Joint Venture (substructure); Kiewit—Soda—Judson Pacific-Murphy Joint Venture (superstructure)
- Construction start: March 1953
- Construction cost: US$62,000,000 (equivalent to $734,200,000 in 2025)
- Opened: September 1, 1956; 70 years ago

Statistics
- Daily traffic: 66,800 (2011) 67,800 (2012); 72,300 (2013); 75,600 (2014) 79,200 (2015)
- Toll: Westbound only; FasTrak or pay-by-plate, cash not accepted; Effective January 1 – December 31, 2026: $8.50; $4.25 (carpool rush hours, FasTrak only)

Location
- Interactive map of Richmond–San Rafael Bridge

The Richmond–San Rafael Bridge (officially renamed the John F. McCarthy Memorial Bridge in 1981) is the northernmost east–west crossing of California's San Francisco Bay. Carrying Interstate 580, it connects Richmond on the east shore to San Rafael on the west. The bridge opened on September 1, 1956, replacing service previously provided by the Richmond–San Rafael Ferry Company. It was the last bridge built across the bay that replaced a ferry service, and the state legislature later renamed it to honor Senator John F. McCarthy, who championed its funding.

Measuring 29,040 ft (5.500 mi; 8.85 km) including approaches, the structure ranked as the world's second-longest bridge when completed, trailing only the San Francisco–Oakland Bay Bridge. The double-decked span rests on 79 reinforced concrete piers anchored by steel H-piles and crosses two distinct navigation channels using twin cantilever structures. The roadway rises to clear each cantilever span and dips between them — Raab built the two cantilevers identically as a cost-saving measure, forcing the same grade profile on both sides and producing the distinctive "roller coaster" vertical undulation. Structural engineers later criticized this sagging center profile for violating the aesthetic principle that a bridge should soar. The non-parallel alignment of the two navigation channels also forces the bridge into a gentle S-shaped horizontal curve. Frank Lloyd Wright was particularly harsh, reportedly calling it "the most awful thing I've ever seen" while it was under construction in 1953.

The state launched a comprehensive seismic retrofit in 2001, finishing the $778 million project in September 2005. Engineers designed the reinforcements to withstand a 7.4 magnitude earthquake on the nearby Hayward Fault. A protected bicycle and pedestrian path was later added to the upper deck in November 2019. Beginning in October 2025, regional authorities placed the path on a restricted weekend-heavy schedule, converting the lane into a westbound vehicle shoulder on weekdays to alleviate traffic.

The Bay Area Toll Authority collects tolls exclusively from westbound traffic. The plaza shifted to all-electronic tolling in March 2020, and standard auto tolls are scheduled to rise from $8.50 in early 2026 to $10.50 by 2030. Following a 2025 National Transportation Safety Board report noting the bridge lacked a modern vessel-strike vulnerability assessment, local officials have called for a full replacement. The Metropolitan Transportation Commission estimates a new bridge would cost between $16 billion and $22 billion, while a structural retrofit would run approximately $4 billion.

== History ==
The Richmond–San Rafael Ferry Company, incorporated in 1913, began running auto ferries across San Pablo Bay on May 1, 1915. The vessels connected Castro Point in Richmond to San Quentin Point in Marin County. The company eventually operated a fleet of double-ended boats, including the City of Richmond and City of San Rafael, on roughly half-hourly schedules, completing the trip in about 20 minutes. The ferries ran continuously until the night of August 31, 1956, shutting down just as the new bridge opened.

=== Early proposals ===
Proposals for a fixed bay crossing emerged in the 1920s, well before the Golden Gate Bridge opened. In 1927, Roy O. Long applied for a franchise to construct a private steel suspension bridge spanning from Point Orient to McNear's Point, estimating the cost at US$12,000,000 (equivalent to $222,400,000 in 2025). Charles Van Damme, representing the ferry company, quickly countered with a competing proposal carrying an identical price tag. His version mapped a route from Castro Point to Point San Quentin, the alignment the state would eventually use decades later.

Long won the initial franchise in February 1928, prompting Van Damme to petition the decision. The rivals opted to merge their interests that September. Oscar Klatt took over the combined project and managed to secure a War Department construction permit by 1930. However, the Great Depression halted the project's funding. The plans lay dormant for nearly ten years, seeing only brief flickers of revived interest in 1939 and 1947 before state-led efforts finally took over.

=== Tomasini's San Francisco–Alameda–Marin crossings ===
T.A. Tomasini submitted a third proposal in late 1927, one far more ambitious than either prior plan. He initially envisioned a combined rail-and-automobile bridge running over five miles from San Pedro Hill to San Pablo. A year later, he revised the route to stretch from Albany to Tiburon. The Albany–Tiburon bridge would have been the longest of the early proposals, using a high-level western section with 1,000-foot navigation spans that transitioned into a low-level eastern causeway. Shipping interests immediately pushed back, arguing that the navigation spans were dangerously narrow.

Tomasini's proposed 1928 San Francisco Bay crossings, shown in orange. Red bridges are those that were built, including the 1956 Richmond–San Rafael Bridge (1). 1937 Golden Gate Bridge (2), and 1936 San Francisco-Oakland Bay Bridge (3) .: 1. Albany–Tiburon bridge; 2. Sausalito–Belvedere bridge; 3. San Francisco–Marin–Alameda tunnel & bridge

Tomasini continued to scale up his vision. He proposed an additional bridge across Richardson Bay linking Sausalito to Belvedere, and drew up plans for a massive bridge-and-tunnel system tying San Francisco to the Albany-Tiburon span via Goat Island. He estimated the total cost for the three interconnected structures at US$55,670,000 (equivalent to $1,043,800,000 in 2025).

San Francisco supervisors ultimately rejected the tunnel connection. Tomasini brought on prominent engineer Ralph Modjeski as a consultant and managed to secure War Department approval for the $35 million Albany-Tiburon segment in 1932. He filed numerous extensions over the next decade to keep the project alive but repeatedly failed to secure bond funding. He lost the franchise rights in October 1941, though he continued promoting variations of the plan as late as 1948.

=== Construction: 1953–1957 ===
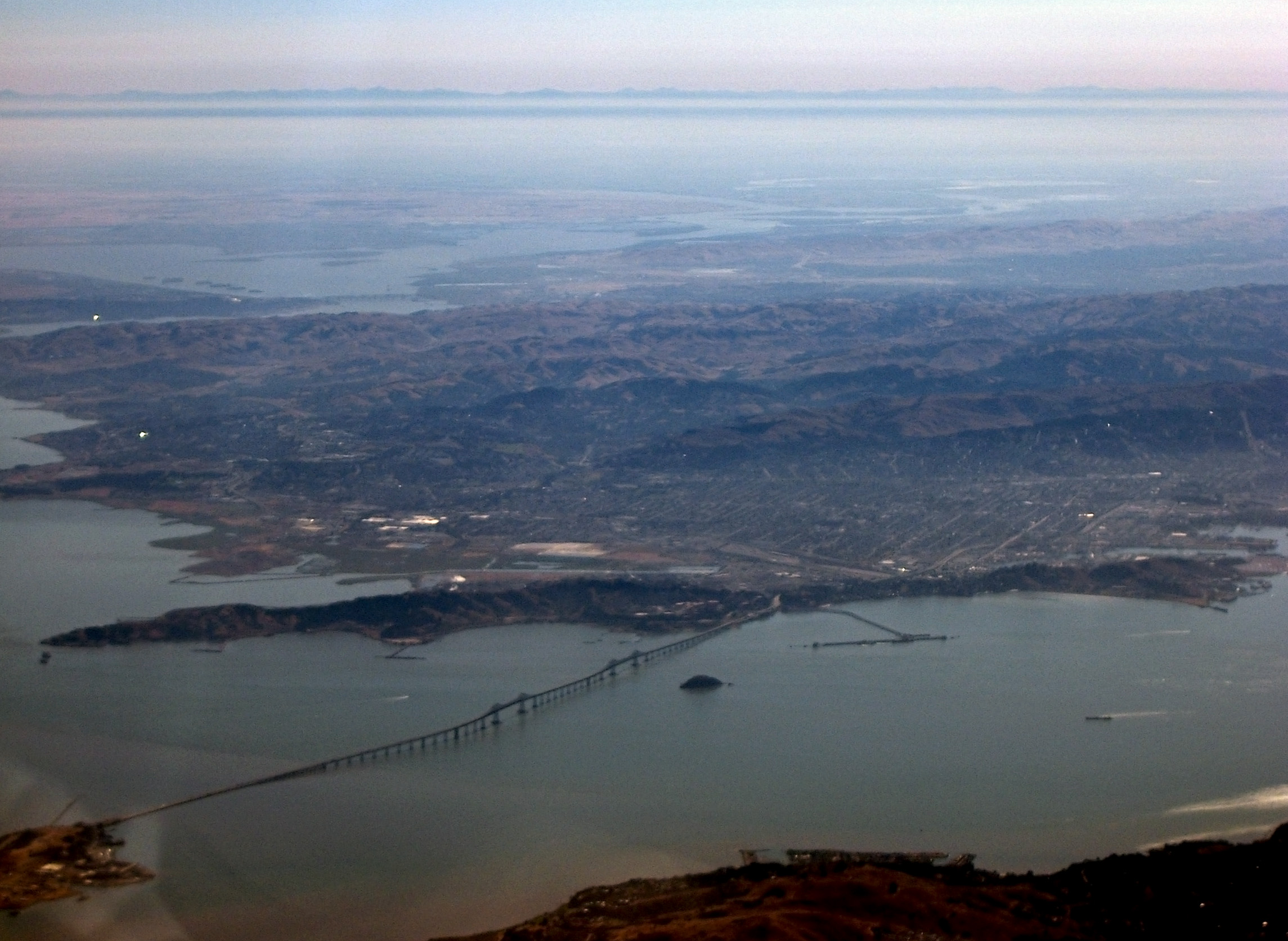
Aerial photo of the bay

In 1949, Marin County and the City of Richmond commissioned a preliminary engineering report from Earl and Wright of San Francisco, officially concluding that bridging the corridor was feasible. A state-funded follow-up study in 1950 determined the project could proceed under the California Toll Bridge Authority Act. The preliminary design was approved in 1951, and the California Toll Bridge Authority authorized a US$72,000,000 (equivalent to $872,900,000 in 2025) bond issue the following year. In early 1953, the state sold US$62,000,000 (equivalent to $746,100,000 in 2025) in bonds to construct a single-deck structure, keeping the remainder in reserve. Governor Goodwin Knight soon intervened, arguing that delaying the second deck ran counter to the public interest. A US$6,000,000 (equivalent to $72,100,000 in 2025) loan from the State School Land Fund allowed crews to complete both decks at once, and the project ultimately finished $4 million under budget.

The state incorporated the bridge into State Route 17, though it would later become part of Interstate 580. Planners had briefly considered building an earth and rock-fill causeway with lock structures, but opted for a high-level span because the navigation locks proved cost-prohibitive.

Two contracts covered the vast majority of the construction costs. The Ben C. Gerwick, Inc. — Peter Kiewit Sons' Co. Joint Venture secured the substructure contract with a low bid of US$14,234,550 (equivalent to $171,300,000 in 2025), while a joint venture led by Kiewit, Soda, and Judson Pacific Murphy Corp handled the superstructure for US$21,099,319 (equivalent to $253,900,000 in 2025). Crews drove the substructure work forward rapidly, completing nearly half of the massive concrete piers within the first year.

The upper deck opened to traffic on September 1, 1956, following a dedication ceremony the previous day. The lower deck was completed and opened on August 20, 1957, bringing the bridge up to three lanes in each direction. Its completion marked the last time a Bay Area bridge replaced an existing ferry service. The only auto ferry left operating on the bay was the Benicia–Martinez Ferry in the Carquinez Strait, which a new bridge replaced in 1962.

== Description ==
Bridges in the San Francisco Bay

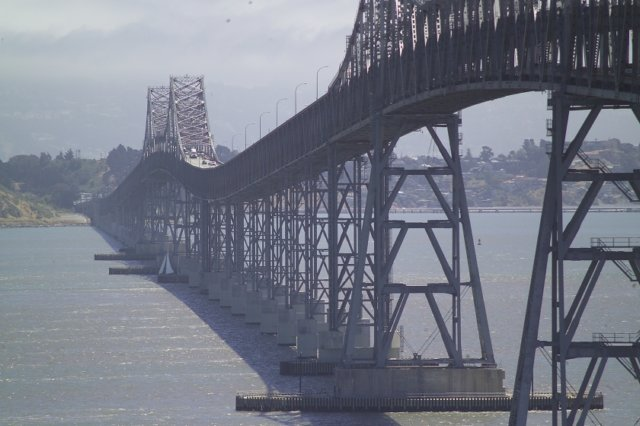
Vertical undulation of the Richmond–San Rafael Bridge between the two cantilever spans

Spanning 5.5 miles (8.9 km) from end to end, the bridge crosses two major ship channels using separate cantilever spans. Because these spans sit high above the water to let ships pass, the long center section between them creates a deep visual dip. Norman Raab engineered the two cantilevers to be perfectly symmetrical to cut steel fabrication costs. This forced the "uphill" approach grade to be mirrored exactly on the "downhill" side of the span, resulting in the depressed center truss. The two navigation channels also cross the bay at different angles, so the bridge cannot follow a straight line and instead bends into a gentle S-curve. Locals and critics have frequently compared its silhouette to a roller coaster or a "bent coat hanger."

The severe utilitarian look drew sharp criticism from the architectural community, contrasting heavily with the celebrated designs of the Golden Gate Bridge and the San Francisco–Oakland Bay Bridge. Frank Lloyd Wright argued it should be demolished, famously telling reporters in 1953 that it was the most awful thing he had ever seen. Yet many of the senior engineers who worked on the project were veterans of the Bay Bridge construction, and they deliberately applied the structural lessons they had learned from that earlier crossing.

Moving west to east from Point San Quentin to Castro Point, the structure consists of:

- A 2,845-foot (867 m) trestle structure resting on fifty-seven bents. The lower deck here runs slightly longer than the upper, reaching 3,635 feet (1,108 m).
- 1,900 feet (580 m) of girder spans spanning nineteen 100-foot (30 m) segments.
- 4,125 feet (1,257 m) of truss spans, split across fourteen trusses averaging 292 feet (89 m) each.
- The western 2,145-foot (654 m) cantilever structure. This is the primary navigation channel, offering a 1,070-foot-wide (330 m) opening and 185 feet (56 m) of vertical clearance for deep-draft vessels.
- A 2,955-foot (901 m) run of ten center truss spans.
- The eastern 2,145-foot (654 m) cantilever structure. This handles the secondary shipping channel, mirroring the 1,070 feet (330 m) width but with a lower vertical clearance of 135 feet (41 m).
- 3,505 feet (1,068 m) of eastern truss spans over twelve segments.
- A final 1,715 feet (523 m) stretch of 100-foot (30 m) girder spans landing in Richmond.

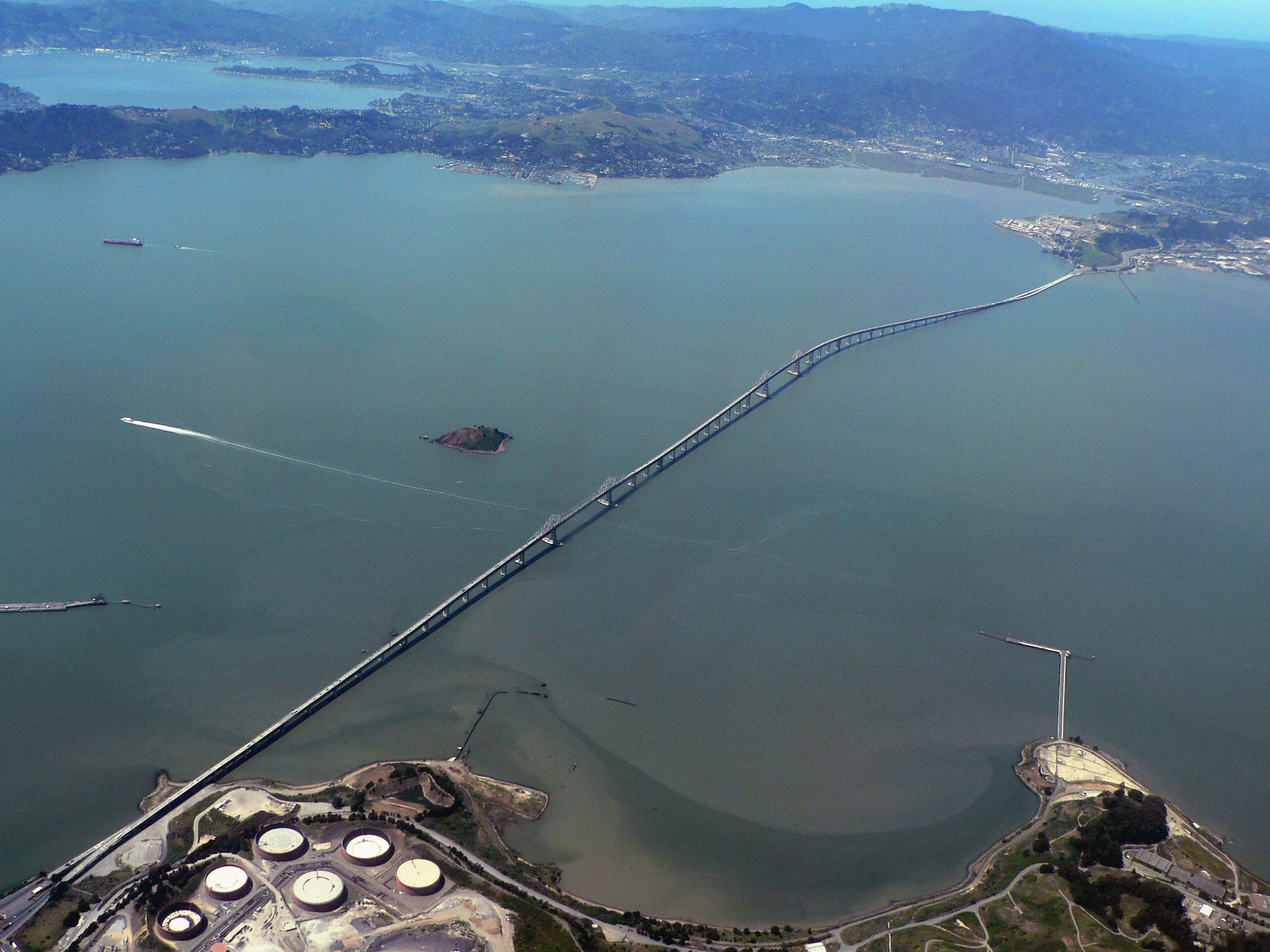
Looking southwest from above Richmond

The steel portions of the bridge extend 21,335 feet (6,503 m) on the upper deck and 22,125 feet (6,744 m) on the lower. Despite the heavy undulations, the roadway grade never exceeds 3%. The western channel's generous 185 feet (56 m) clearance easily accommodates the large oil tankers and container ships heading to ports in Richmond, Martinez, Benicia, and Sacramento. The lower eastern cantilever generally serves smaller commercial traffic.

Westbound traffic travels on the upper deck, which houses two vehicle lanes alongside the separated bicycle and pedestrian path. Eastbound traffic uses the lower deck, which features two full-time vehicle lanes and a third shoulder lane that activates with overhead signals during the evening commute.

The bridge rests on 79 reinforced concrete piers anchored by steel H-piles. Nine piers sit entirely on land, eight are sealed in cofferdams near the Contra Costa shoreline, and the remaining 62 are massive bell-type structures flaring out across the bay floor. The original roadway surface was poured as a 5.5-inch (140 mm) thick reinforced concrete slab, topped with a 0.5 inches (13 mm) mortar wearing surface. To aid maintenance crews, builders installed compressed air and potable water lines running the full length of the span, and equipped each deck with three overhead maintenance tracks.

=== Public transit service ===
Golden Gate Transit provides bus service across the bridge, including routes 580 and 580X, which connect the San Rafael Transit Center with the El Cerrito del Norte BART station. The bridge does not carry rail lines; the nearest BART stations are located several miles away at either end of the highway corridor.

== Tolls ==
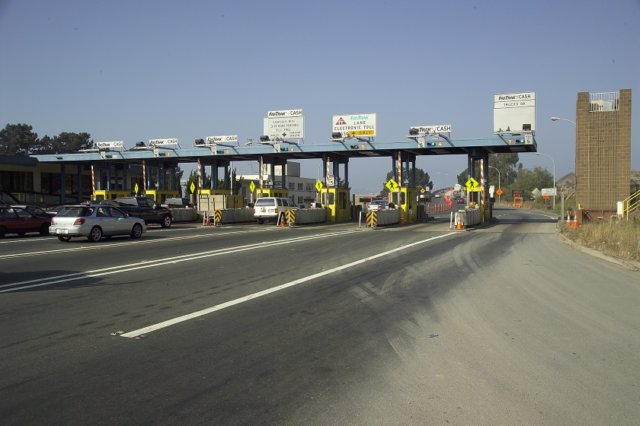
Toll plaza at Richmond in 2006 before newest reconstruction

The Bay Area Toll Authority collects tolls exclusively from westbound traffic entering the bridge from Richmond. The facility shifted entirely to all-electronic tolling in March 2020, requiring drivers to pay via FasTrak transponders or license-plate billing. The standard automobile toll is $8.50 as of January 1, 2026. During weekday peak hours (5:00–10:00 a.m. and 3:00–7:00 p.m.), carpools carrying three or more occupants and motorcycles pay a discounted $4.25 rate, provided they use a FasTrak Flex transponder. Two-person carpools may use the dedicated HOV lanes but must pay the standard toll.

=== Historical toll rates ===
The California Toll Bridge Authority adopted the following initial toll rates on July 10, 1956, shortly before the bridge opened:

A commutation book for the Richmond-San Rafael Bridge, circa 1988

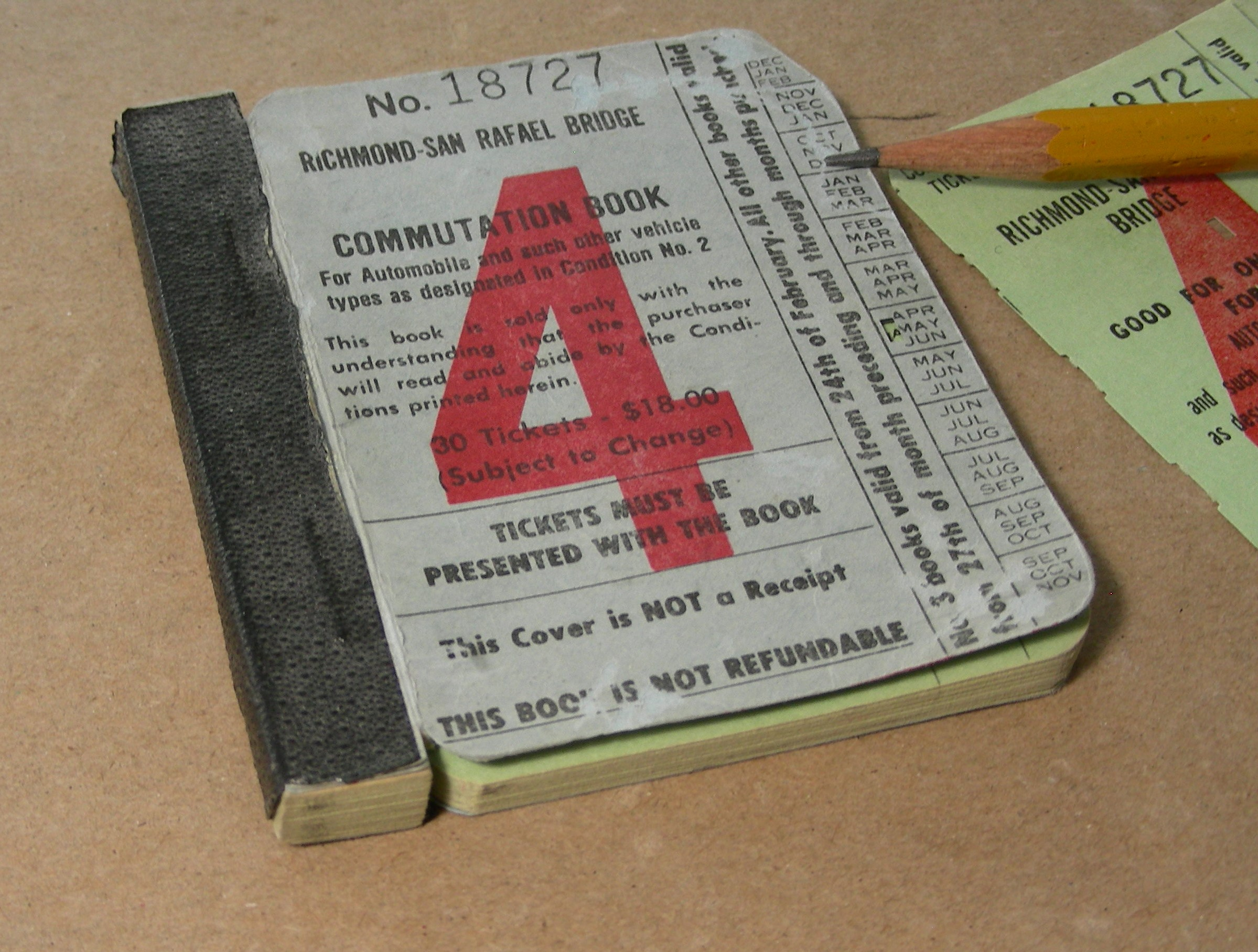
Front cover, showing price of $18 for 30 toll tickets.

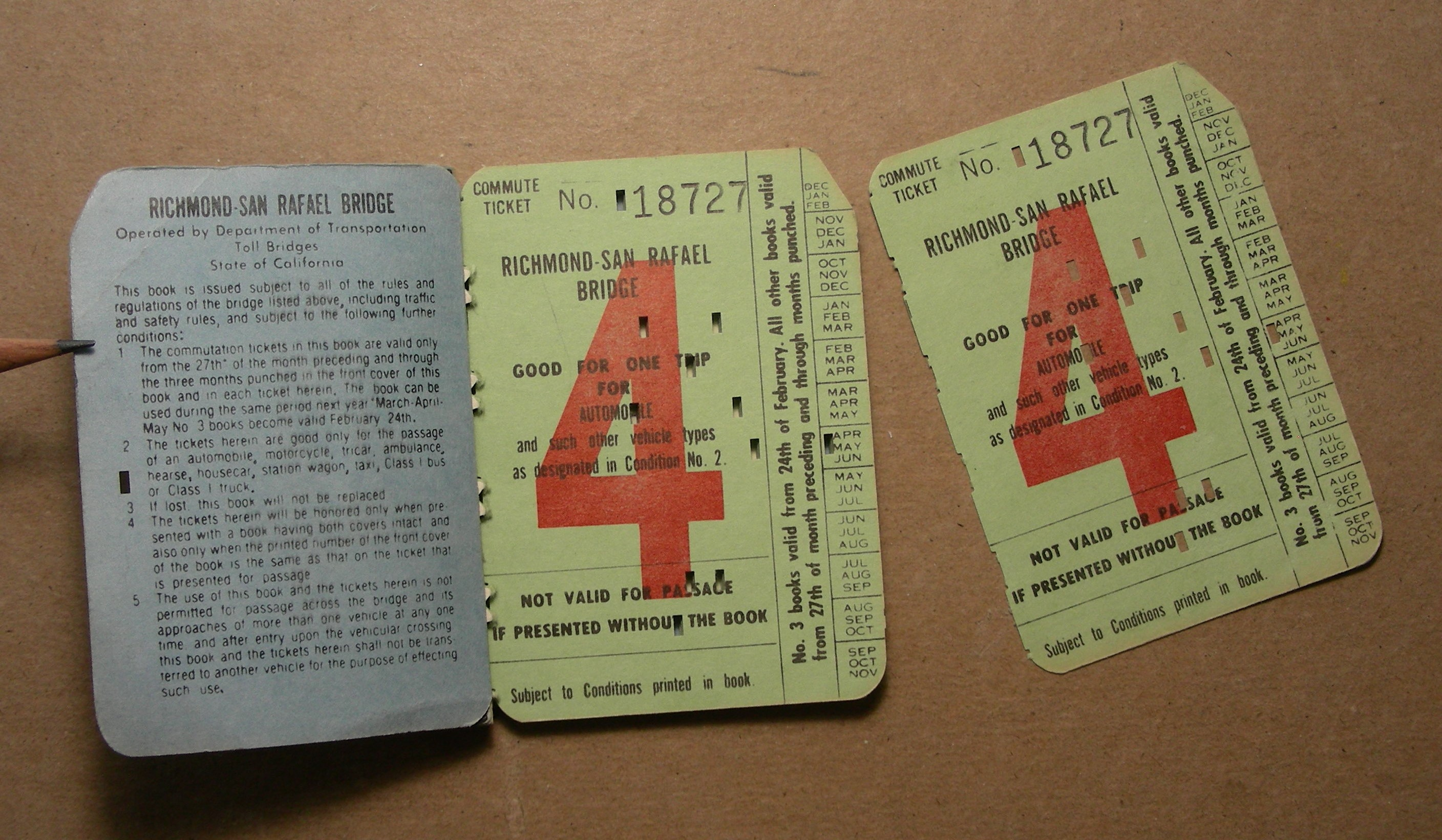
Inside front cover, and a detached ticket. Hole punched at right edge indicates valid period as April to June. The large number "4" refers to the first month of this period.

Inaugural toll schedule
Vehicle type	Axles/trailers	Toll
Class 1 (Note: Class 1 vehicles are defined as: automobiles, motorcycles, tri-cars, light delivery automobiles, ambulances, hearses, housecars, noncommercial trucks, station wagons, and taxis.)	vehicle alone	US$0.75 (equivalent to $8.88 in 2025) (Note: Motorcycle toll was initially proposed as US$0.25 (equivalent to $2.96 in 2025), but Norman Raab successfully argued the tight pants worn by motorcyclists meant the driver would have to dismount to retrieve the coins for the toll.)
Class 1	Commutation book (Note: Commutation books were sold with 50 one-way tickets good for a single passage at any time during the two consecutive calendar months, or fractional part thereof, for which sold.) (Note: Any Class 1 vehicle, with the exception of light delivery automobiles and noncommercial trucks, was eligible for the commutation book.)	US$18.75 (equivalent to $222.04 in 2025)
Class 1	with 1-axle trailer	US$1.25 (equivalent to $14.8 in 2025)
Class 1	with 2-axle trailer	US$1.50 (equivalent to $17.76 in 2025)
Truck (Note: A truck shall include a truck-tractor, or any combination of truck, truck-tractor and trailer or semitrailer)	2-axle	US$1.25 (equivalent to $14.8 in 2025)
Truck	3-axle	US$1.75 (equivalent to $20.72 in 2025)
Truck	4-axle	US$2.50 (equivalent to $29.61 in 2025)
Truck	5-axle	US$3.00 (equivalent to $35.53 in 2025)
Truck	6-axle	US$3.50 (equivalent to $41.45 in 2025)
Truck	7-axle	US$4.00 (equivalent to $47.37 in 2025)
Bus	2-axle	US$1.50 (equivalent to $17.76 in 2025)
Bus	3-axle	US$1.75 (equivalent to $20.72 in 2025)
Other vehicles not specified above		US$5.00 (equivalent to $59.21 in 2025)
Inaugural toll table notes

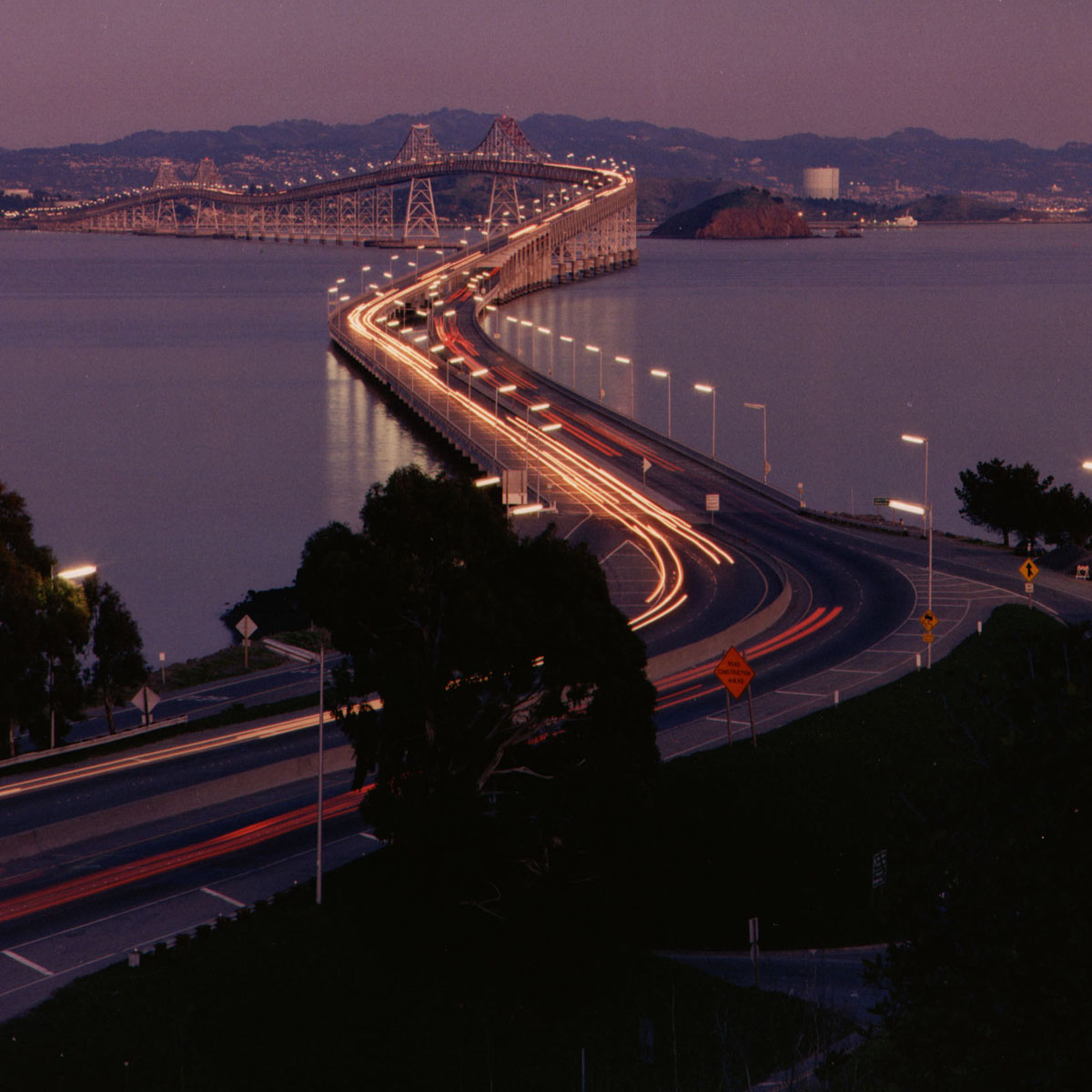
Westbound terminus of the Richmond–San Rafael Bridge in sunset, 2006

Bay Area voters standardized the basic automobile toll across all seven state-owned bridges to $1 by passing Regional Measure 1 in 1988. Over the next two decades, voters and the state legislature approved a series of incremental increases to fund massive seismic retrofits and regional transportation improvements. A $1 seismic surcharge took effect in 1998, followed by another dollar under Regional Measure 2 in 2004. The toll bumped to $4 in 2007 to absorb heavy cost overruns on the new Bay Bridge eastern span, and reached $5 in 2010 to keep the broader seismic retrofit program funded.

In June 2018, voters passed Regional Measure 3, which laid out a phased pricing scale that eventually pushed the basic auto toll to $8 by January 2025.

The onset of the COVID-19 pandemic forced the state to halt cash collection, accelerating a permanent shift to all-electronic tolling in March 2020. In April 2022, the Bay Area Toll Authority approved a $77 million plan to demolish the remaining toll booths across all seven bridges and replace them with overhead gantry-based open-road tolling systems.

Faced with mounting infrastructure maintenance costs, the Bay Area Toll Authority approved a scheduled set of 50-cent annual increases in late 2024. The standard auto toll bumped to $8.50 on January 1, 2026, and will step up each year until it hits $10.50 in 2030. In January 2026, the bridge became the first state-owned toll facility to begin conversion to open-road tolling at highway speeds. Pre-construction work started in late 2025, with lane restriping and overhead gantry installations scheduled to begin in July 2026.

== Improvements ==
=== Seismic retrofit ===
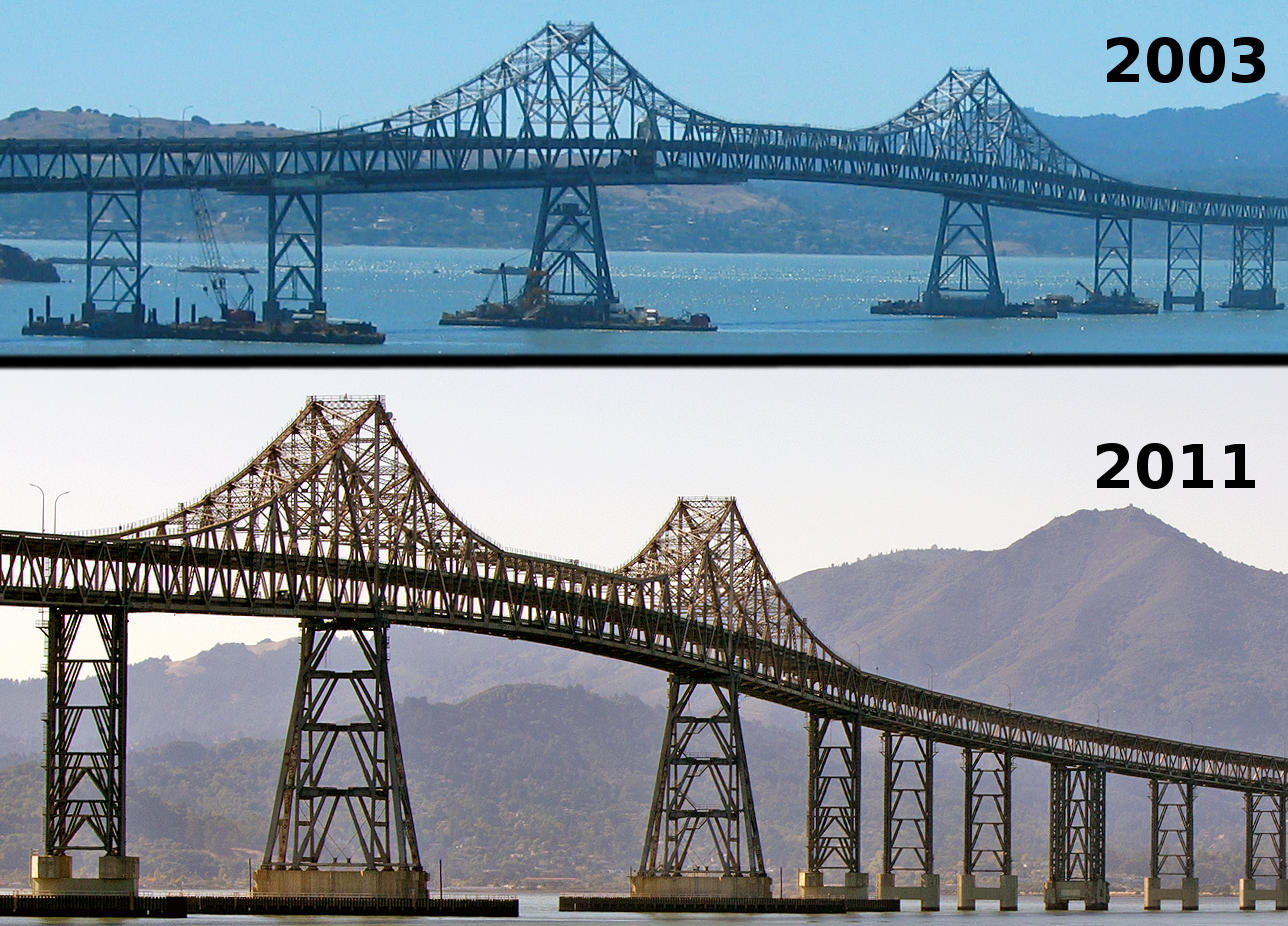
Comparison of piers at eastern cantilever span in 2003 before reconstruction (top) and at western cantilever span in 2011 after reconstruction (bottom).

The bridge underwent an extensive seismic retrofit starting in the fall of 2001. A joint venture between Gerwick, Sverdrup, and DMJM handled the design under a US$19,000,000 (equivalent to $40,100,000 in 2025) contract. Engineers focused on protecting the two-tier structure from a potential 7.4 magnitude earthquake on the nearby Hayward Fault or an 8.3 magnitude rupture on the San Andreas Fault. Crews strengthened the foundation piers by encasing the lower sections of structural steel in thick concrete jackets, driving new shear piles, and welding heavy bracing directly into the steel towers. Isolation joints and bearings were also installed across the main cantilever structures to give the steel room to flex.

The bridge had already developed serious age-related wear by the time the retrofit began. Chunks of aging concrete were actively spalling off the upper deck slab joints and dropping onto the lower roadway. One of the largest components of the retrofit involved entirely replacing the dilapidated concrete causeway on the Marin side. To keep traffic flowing, Caltrans limited major construction to nighttime hours, maintaining two lanes in each direction during the day. Workers precast new concrete segments in Petaluma and barged them into the bay, where a 900-ton crane hoisted the 500-ton slabs into place under the cover of darkness. Despite complex logistics and the deaths of two construction workers, the project successfully wrapped up on September 22, 2005.

Caltrans engineers initially estimated the retrofit would cost US$329,000,000 (equivalent to $635,900,000 in 2025), but volatile construction markets quickly pushed the figure to US$393,272,000 (equivalent to $735,200,000 in 2025) during the bidding phase. A joint venture between Tutor-Saliba, Koch, and Tidewater won the primary contract with a low bid of US$484,403,479 (equivalent to $905,600,000 in 2025). Successive state budget allocations continually expanded the project's funding envelope, peaking at an estimated US$914,000,000 (equivalent to $1,558,000,000 in 2025) in late 2004. The final bill landed at $778 million.

=== Third lanes ===
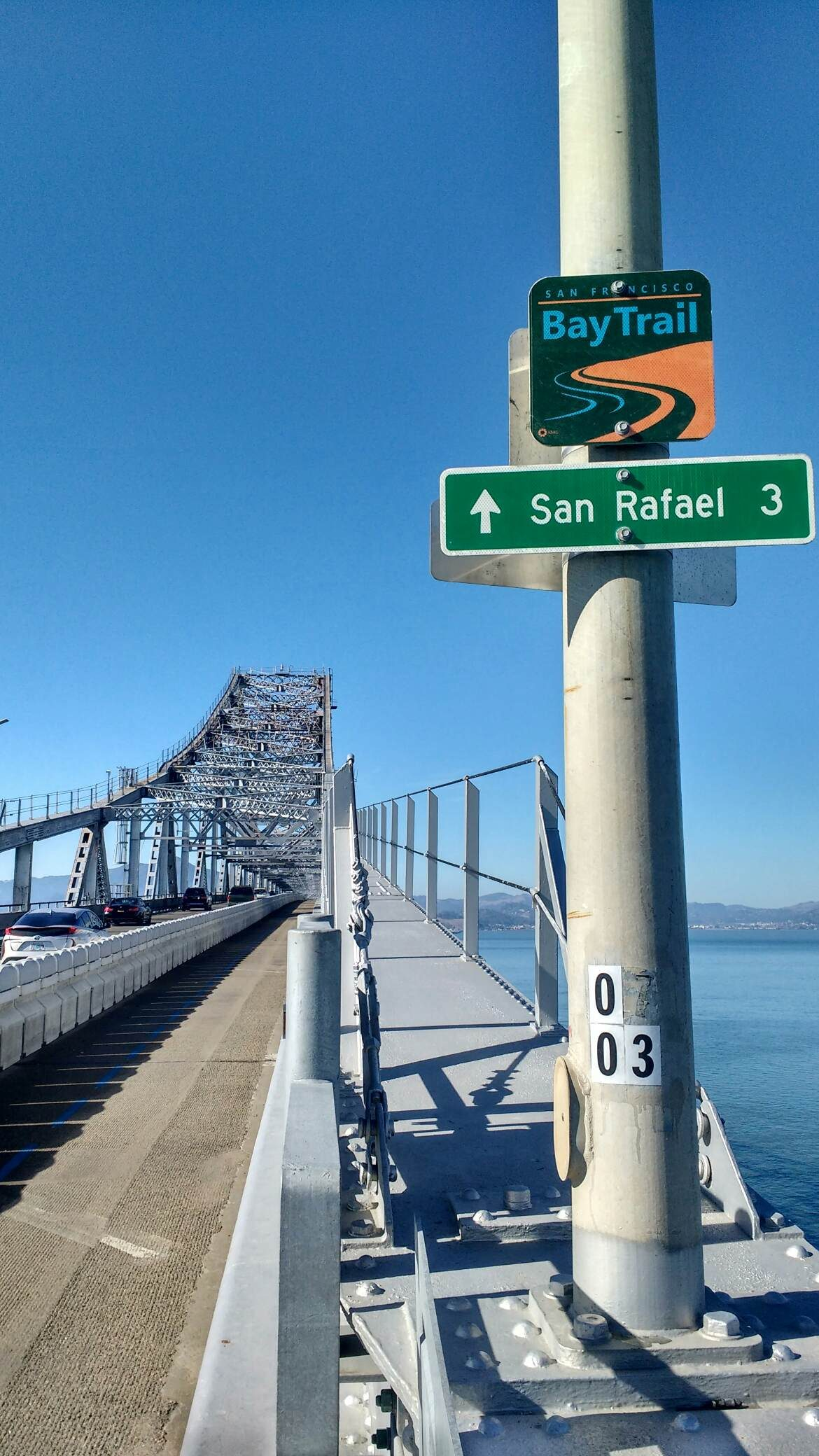
The protected bike/pedestrian path on the upper deck of the bridge

The bridge deck was originally engineered wide enough to support three lanes of traffic in each direction. It operated in this six-lane configuration for years after the lower deck was finished in 1957. Today, the third lane on the upper deck is a dedicated bicycle and pedestrian path, while the lower deck's third lane functions primarily as a breakdown shoulder marked for emergency parking.

The right-hand lane has occasionally served unusual emergency functions. During a severe drought in 1977, crews laid a temporary 6-mile (9.7 km) surface pipeline directly onto the third lane to transport an estimated 8,000,000 to 10,000,000 US gallons (30,000,000 to 38,000,000 L; 6,700,000 to 8,300,000 imp gal) of water daily from the East Bay Municipal Utility District in Richmond to Marin County. The state removed the pipeline after the drought broke, eventually returning the space to a road shoulder.

Following the Loma Prieta earthquake in 1989, a catastrophic span failure shut down the Bay Bridge. The state immediately restriped and opened the Richmond–San Rafael's third lane to help absorb the massive influx of diverted East Bay commuters. The lane was closed again once the Bay Bridge reopened.

The Bay Area Toll Authority approved a plan in 2015 to carve out a protected bike and pedestrian path along the upper deck's wide shoulder. Though initially slated for 2017, the path officially opened on November 16, 2019. As part of the same corridor improvement program, Caltrans added a third eastbound lane on the lower deck the previous year, which opens exclusively during evening commute hours to ease bottlenecks.

To manage peak traffic congestion, the toll authority restricted access to the bike path starting October 27, 2025. The path is now limited to a weekend-heavy schedule, Thursday 2:00 p.m. through Sunday 11:00 p.m., allowing the concrete barrier to shift and open the lane as a westbound highway shoulder during the rest of the week. A free bicycle shuttle trailer operates between Point Richmond and San Rafael when the path is closed to riders.

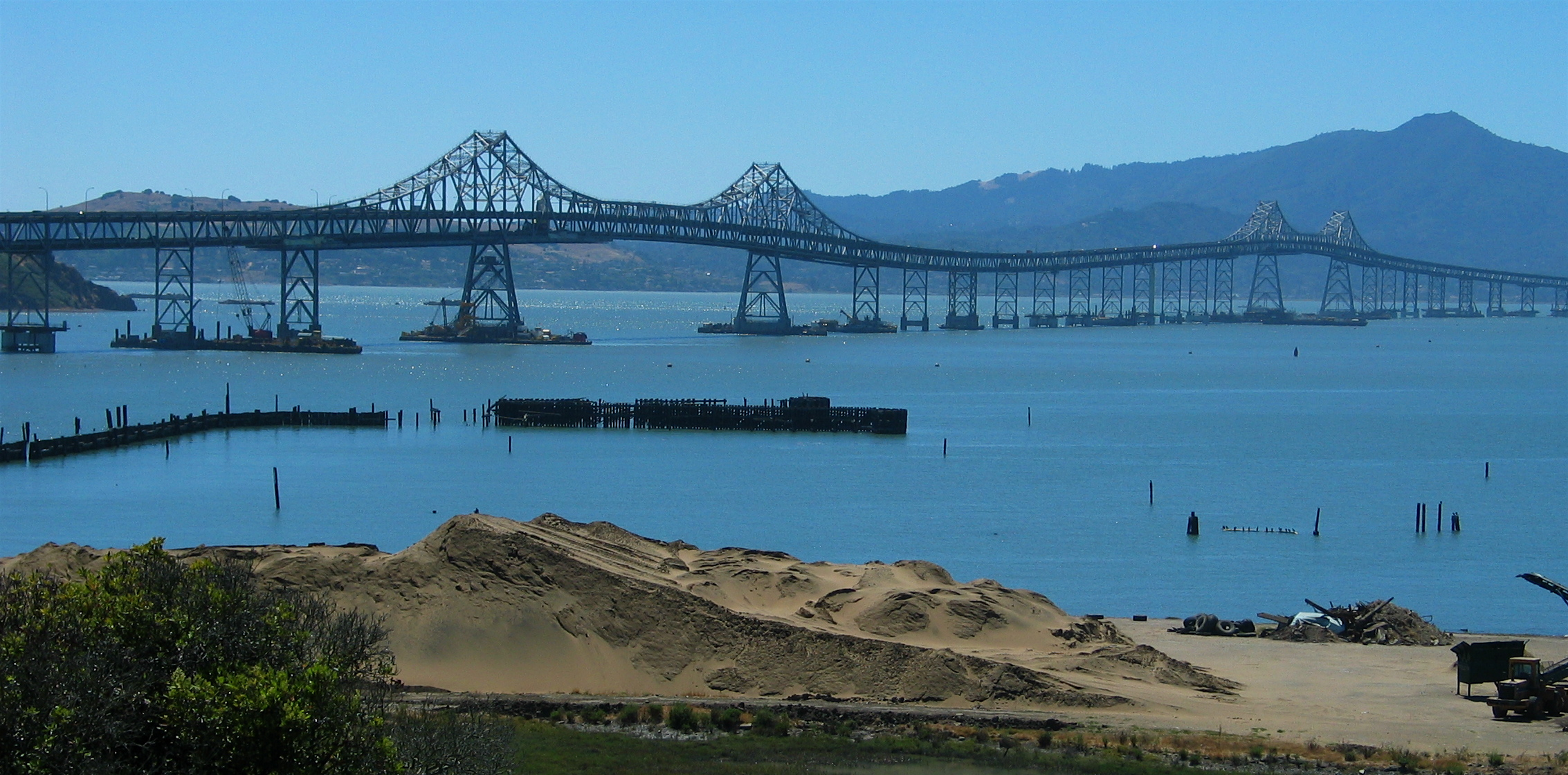
View from the east end of the bridge (Richmond) looking southwest toward Southern Marin. San Quentin State Prison is at the far end of the bridge (San Rafael), just beyond the edge of the picture on the right. Top right above the bridge is Mount Tamalpais. The broken pilings in the water in the middle left of the picture are the remains of the pier where the Richmond–San Rafael ferry docked before the bridge was built.

== Future ==
=== Vessel-strike risk assessment ===
The National Transportation Safety Board issued a sweeping marine investigation report in March 2025 identifying 68 major bridges nationwide that lacked a modern vessel-strike vulnerability assessment. Because it was built long before the 1991 AASHTO vessel-strike guidance was published, the Richmond–San Rafael Bridge was listed as "Critical/Essential" in the report's appendix, alongside five other Bay Area crossings. While the NTSB did not conclude the bridge was in imminent danger of collapse, it noted that the true risk level remains unknown until engineers evaluate current shipping traffic patterns against the 1950s pier designs.

=== Replacement proposals ===
Discussions about entirely replacing the bridge gained traction in December 2019, when Assemblymember Marc Levine launched a public campaign demanding the state "repair, rethink and ultimately rebuild the Richmond Bridge." The Bay Area Toll Authority and Caltrans subsequently began studying the crossing's long-term viability.

By mid-2025, local politicians including Contra Costa County Supervisor John Gioia and Richmond Vice Mayor Cesar Zepeda were openly pushing for a new span. They argued that a $4 billion structural retrofit would be a poor investment because it would not expand traffic capacity. The Metropolitan Transportation Commission projects a full replacement would cost between $16 billion and $22 billion, requiring massive injections of federal and state funding.

== Closures ==
Strong crosswinds frequently batter the exposed cantilever sections, occasionally forcing the Highway Patrol to close the bridge entirely. Wind-related shutdowns occurred in 1963, and again during a severe storm in 2008.

On February 7, 2019, falling concrete from the upper deck prompted a multi-hour closure of the lower lanes.

On January 26, 2022, a big rig struck a stalled car on the eastbound span, killing the car's driver and sparking a fire that consumed both vehicles. The crash shuttered all eastbound traffic until the following morning.

The bridge sat empty in the eastbound direction for over 19 hours on July 21, 2023, while crisis negotiators worked to rescue a distressed man from the span.

On October 9, 2023, a big rig crashed into the westbound toll plaza. The collision killed the driver and set the booth on fire, forcing Caltrans to close three westbound lanes for several weeks to execute structural repairs.

More spalling concrete emerged near Pier 25 during the morning commute on June 2, 2025. Emergency repairs closed multiple lanes into the evening, and crews spent the next three weeks executing nightly lane closures to rehabilitate the deck.

== In popular culture and film ==
Michael Savage's novel Abuse of Power features scenes set on the bridge, including a sequence where the protagonist escapes his enemies by scaling the maintenance ladders built into the concrete piers. In the 1973 film Magnum Force, the distinct truss structure looms in the background as Dirty Harry fights a rogue rookie cop on the decks of a decommissioned escort carrier. The bridge also appears briefly in the 1982 film 48 Hours.

== See also ==
- San Francisco–Oakland Bay Bridge
- Golden Gate Bridge
- Carquinez Bridge
- Benicia–Martinez Bridge
- San Mateo–Hayward Bridge
- Antioch Bridge
- Interstate 580 (California)
- Bay Area Toll Authority
- Richmond–San Rafael Ferry Company
