= Glenn B. Woodruff =

- Born: February 8, 1890; Little Meadows, Pennsylvania
- Died: September 4, 1973 (aged 83); San Jose, California
- Education: Cornell University
- Occupations: Bridge Designer and Consulting Engineer
- Employer(s): Bechtel Corp Woodruff and Sampson Consulting
- Notable work: Mid-Hudson Bridge, San Francisco-Oakland Bay Bridge, Mackinac Bridge
- Awards: James Laurie Prize

Glenn Barton Woodruff was an American civil engineer who worked as a design engineer for the 1936 span of the San Francisco-Oakland Bay Bridge and 1957 Mackinac Bridge. He worked as a consulting engineer and for the engineering firms Woodruff and Sampson as well as the Bechtel Corp. He was a celebrated bridge designer and consulting engineer in the San Francisco Bay Area from the 1930s to 1960s. He was in high profile investigations such as the 1940 collapse of the Tacoma Narrows Bridge and the Reber Plan of the late 1940s.

== Personal life ==
Glenn B. Woodruff was born on February 8, 1890, in Little Meadows, Pennsylvania. He married Florence Marion Casey on January 24, 1914. The two had two sons: Gergory C. and Arthur Edward Woodruff. His son Arthur was born in 1921 and worked as a civilian for the US Navy on Guam and was captured by the Japanese after their invasion on December 10, 1941. He spent time in Japanese camp in Kobe for the rest of the war. While imprisoned he met a Turkish woman, Nalia. At the end of the war the two married before returning to the United States. Their wedding cost a reported 10 pounds of sugar and 100 yen.

Glenn Woodruff died on September 4, 1973, at the age of 83 in San Jose, California.

== Engineering career ==
Woodruff graduated from Cornell University and spent his career designing bridges, tunnels, power plants, and other structures. After working on the San Francisco-Oakland Bay Bridge, he worked as a consulting engineer for the firm Woodruff and Sampson, as well as Bechtel Corp until he retired in 1969. He was contracted by the State of California as well as the Federal Works Agency.

=== Bridge designing ===
After graduating from Cornell University, Woodruff worked as a design engineer on the Mid-Hudson Bridge in New York State. Afterwards he was offered a position as design engineer of the San Francisco-Oakland Bay Bridge which he worked on from 1931 until 1938.

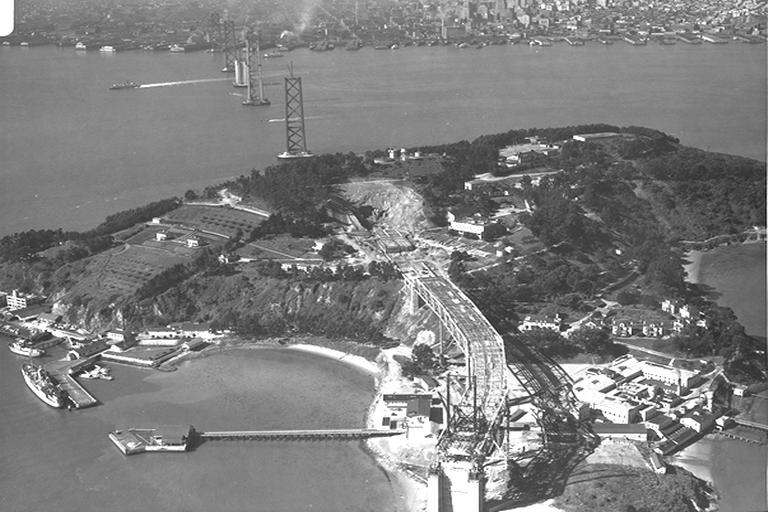
Construction of the San Francisco-Oakland Bay Bridge at Yerba Buena Island, July 1935

Woodruff was one of the three highest-ranked engineers on the project which defined his entire career. Along with lead engineer Charles H. Purcell and C. E. Andrew, Woodruff published a series of thirteen articles detailing the construction and design of the San Francisco-Oakland Bay Bridge from March 1934 to April 1937. Woodruff worked on designs including the bridge foundations, main span, and Yerba Buena Tunnel.

Woodruff noted that the bridge required new theories of design to be developed. Of note were the Purcell-Moran caissons used to place the tower foundations, which were the deepest ever required for a bridge. The resulting bay bridge required the world's largest tunnel (Yerba Buena Tunnel), a new type of double-span suspension bridge, and the longest and heaviest cantilever span ever designed and built. The Oakland Bay Bridge was, at the time it opened, the longest suspension bridge from anchor to anchor, as well as the 3rd longest main span ever built.

In 1941, Woodruff sued the state of California for $19,013 of back wages for his work designing the San Francisco-Oakland Bay Bridge. He claimed his salary was slashed from $1000 per month to $600 per month from 1934 to 1938.

Woodruff later served as a design engineer for the 1957 Mackinac Bridge designed by David B. Steinman. Steinman, who had designed a bridge across the Tacoma Narrows before the design made by Leon Moisseiff, was concerned about a collapse similar to the Tacoma Narrows Bridge. Woodruff was selected as a design engineer in part because of his involvement in the Federal Works Agency investigation. In the early 1940s a design for a Mackinac Strait bridge was abandoned for fear of collapse similar to the Tacoma Narrows Bridge. The Tacoma Narrows Bridge had a width-to-span ratio of 1 to 72, while the proposed Mackinac design had an even more extreme width-to-span ratio of 1 to 92. It wasn't until Steinman took into account what was learned at Tacoma and brought on Woodruff as a design engineer that the Mackinac Bridge was finally built starting in 1954.

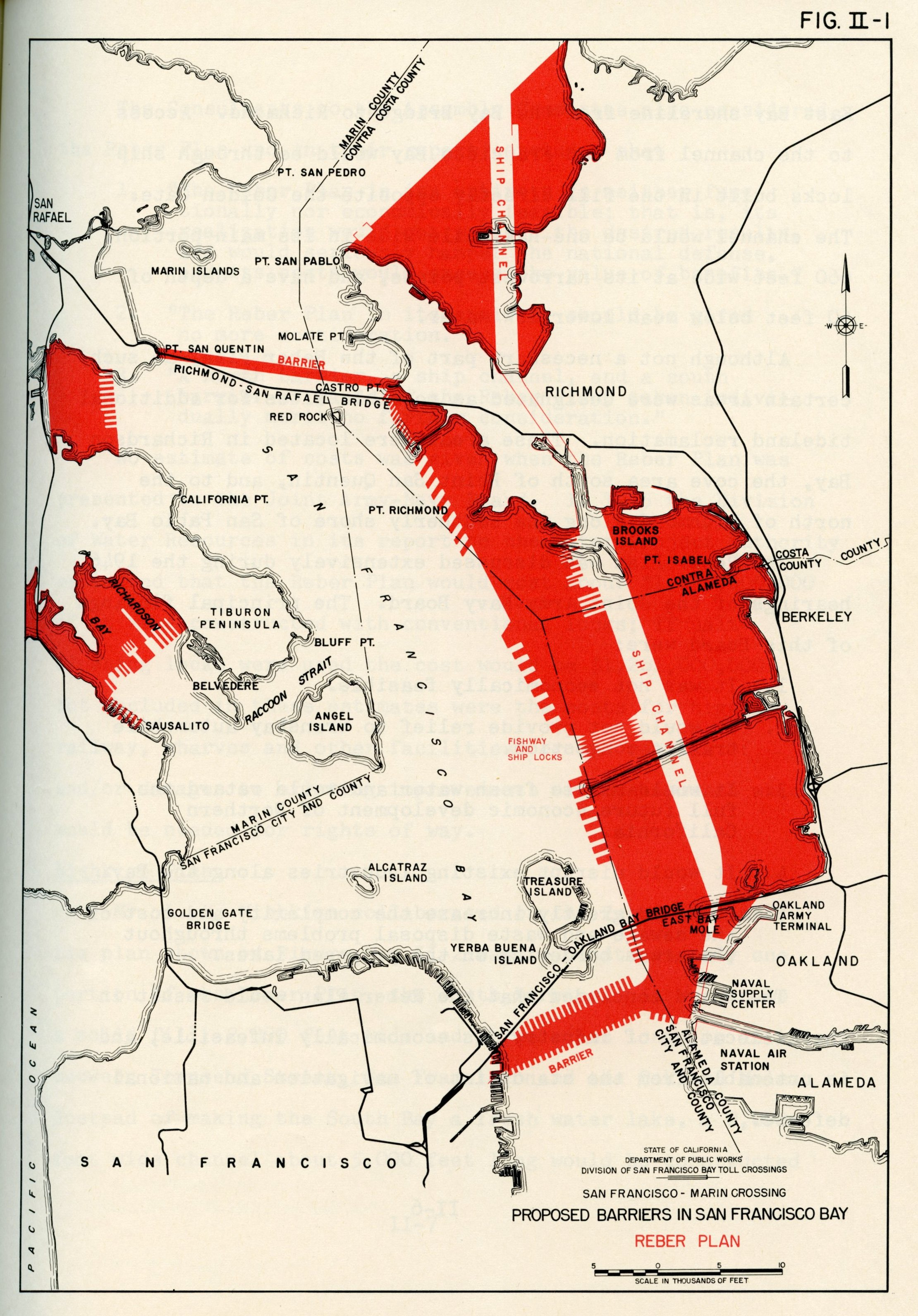
Reber Plan to reclaim 20,000 acres of land from the San Francisco Bay

=== Consulting and later career ===
In 1940, after the collapse of the Tacoma Narrows Bridge in Tacoma, Washington, Woodruff was selected for the board of engineers responsible for investigating the disaster. Along with Woodruff, Federal Works Agency administrator John M. Carmody selected Othmar H. Amman and Theodore Von Kármán to publish a report explaining the collapse. Woodruff and Ammann were brought on as consulting engineers due to their extensive work on designing long suspension spans. The report was submitted on March 28, 1941. Coincidentally, the collapse of the Tacoma Narrows Bridge meant Woodruff's San Francisco-Oakland Bay Bridge reclaimed its title as the third-longest span in the country.

Woodruff was an early and vocal opponent of the Reber Plan to reclaim 20,000 acres (81 square kilometers) of the San Francisco Bay. Woodruff prepared a report in 1946 for the plan to be "dismissed from further consideration". he worked as Engineer for the Alameda County Committee for a Second Bay Crossing, which was responsible for reviewing the Reber plan. After review, he estimated the project would cost $2.5 billion, which was more than 10 times Reber's own estimation. Woodruff declared that the discrepancy was due to Reber not fully understanding the geology of the San Francisco Bay.

In 1957, Woodruff won the James Laurie Prize from the American Society of Civil Engineers (ASCE) for his paper "The Vibrations of Steel Stacks" along with Walter L. Dickey. He accepted the award in New York on October 16. In 1957, the prize was awarded to the ASCE paper deemed to have the second highest merit of the year. The paper with the highest merit was awarded the Thomas Fitch Rowland Prize.
