= U.S. Army Corps of Engineers Bay Model =

Hydraulic scale model

Bay Model Visitor Center
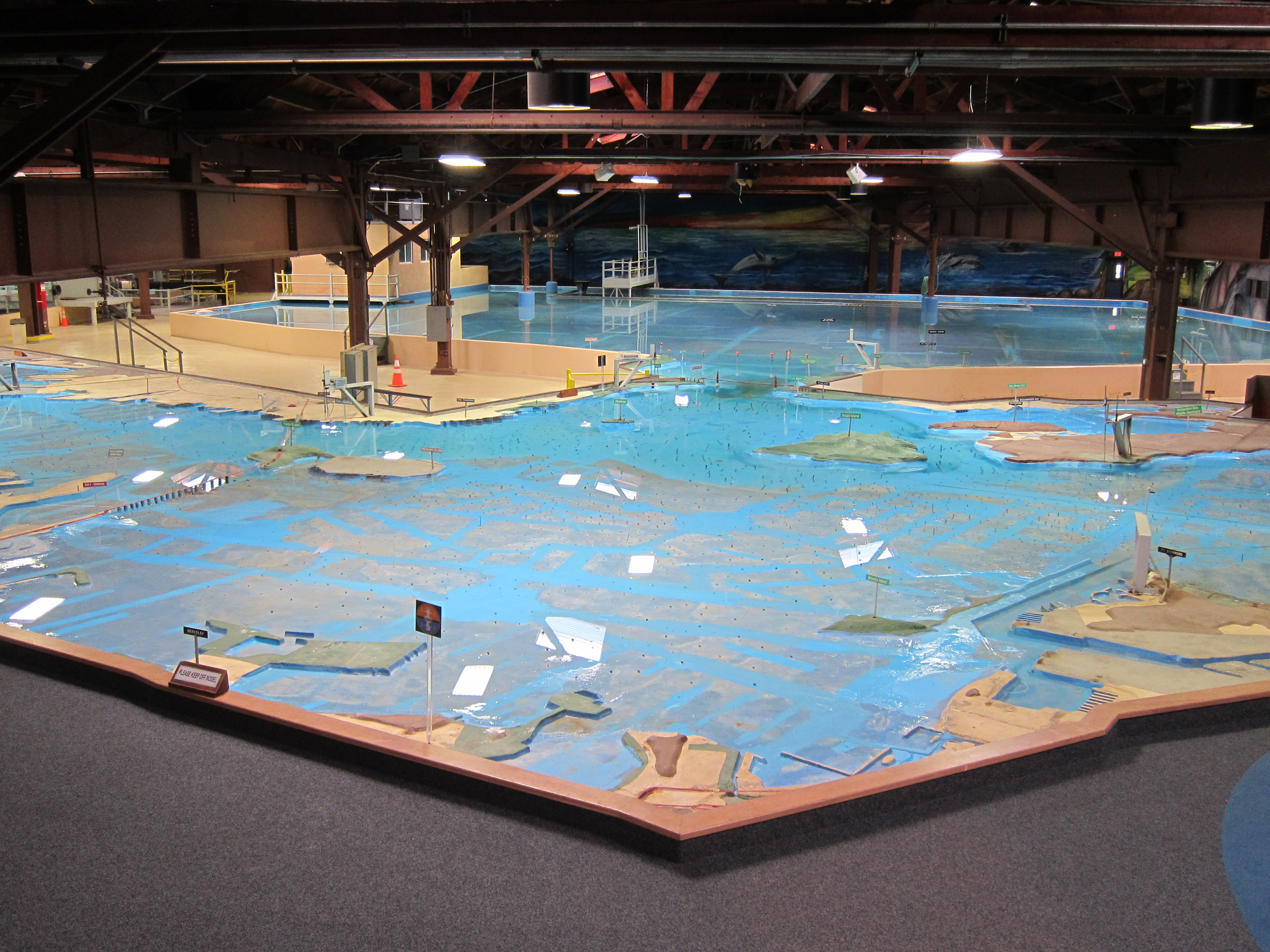
- View of the San Francisco Bay portion of the Bay Model.

- Location within San Francisco Bay Area
- Established: 1957
- Location: 2100 Bridgeway, Sausalito, California
- Coordinates: 37°51′48.61″N 122°29′41.75″W
- Key holdings: Hydraulic model of the San Francisco Bay and Sacramento–San Joaquin River Delta
- Owners: US Army Corps of Engineers, San Francisco District
- Public transit access: Golden Gate Transit, bus routes 2, 4, 30, or 92; or Golden Gate Ferry from San Francisco
- Website: Official website

The U.S. Army Corps of Engineers Bay Model is a working hydraulic scale model of the San Francisco Bay and Sacramento-San Joaquin River Delta System. While the Bay Model is still operational, it is no longer used for scientific research but is instead open to the public alongside educational exhibits about Bay hydrology. The model is located in the Bay Model Visitor Center at 2100 Bridgeway Blvd. in Sausalito, California.

== History ==
In the late 1940s, John Reber proposed to build two large dams in the San Francisco Bay as a way to provide a more reliable freshwater supply to residents and farms and to connect local communities. In 1953, the U.S. Army Corps of Engineers proposed a detailed study of the so-called Reber Plan. Cornelius Biemond proposed a similar plan which would dam the Sacramento River in the delta region to feed aqueducts with freshwater. Authorized by Section 110 of the Rivers and Harbors Act of 1950, construction of the Bay Model was completed in 1957 to study the plans. The tests proved that the plan was not viable, and the Reber Plan was scuttled.

The Sacramento-San Joaquin River Delta portion was added to the model in 1966-1969 to provide information for studies concerning impacts of the deepening of navigation channels, realignment of Delta channels (via the Peripheral Canal), and various flow arrangements on water quality. When completed, the expanded model covered 2 acres (0.81 ha) of land.

== Size and scope ==
The model is approximately 320 feet (98 m) long in the north-south direction and about 400 feet (120 m) long in the east-west direction. It is constructed out of 286 five-ton concrete slabs joined together like a jigsaw puzzle. Features that affect the water flow of the San Francisco Bay and Sacramento-San Joaquin Delta are reproduced, including ship channels, rivers, creeks, sloughs, the canals in the Delta, fills, major wharfs, piers, slips, dikes, bridges, and breakwaters.

The limits of the model encompass the Pacific Ocean extending 17 miles (27 km) beyond the Golden Gate, San Francisco Bay, San Pablo Bay, Suisun Bay and all of the Sacramento-San Joaquin River Delta to Verona, 17 miles north of Sacramento on the north, and to Vernalis, 32 miles (51 km) south of Stockton on the San Joaquin River on the south.

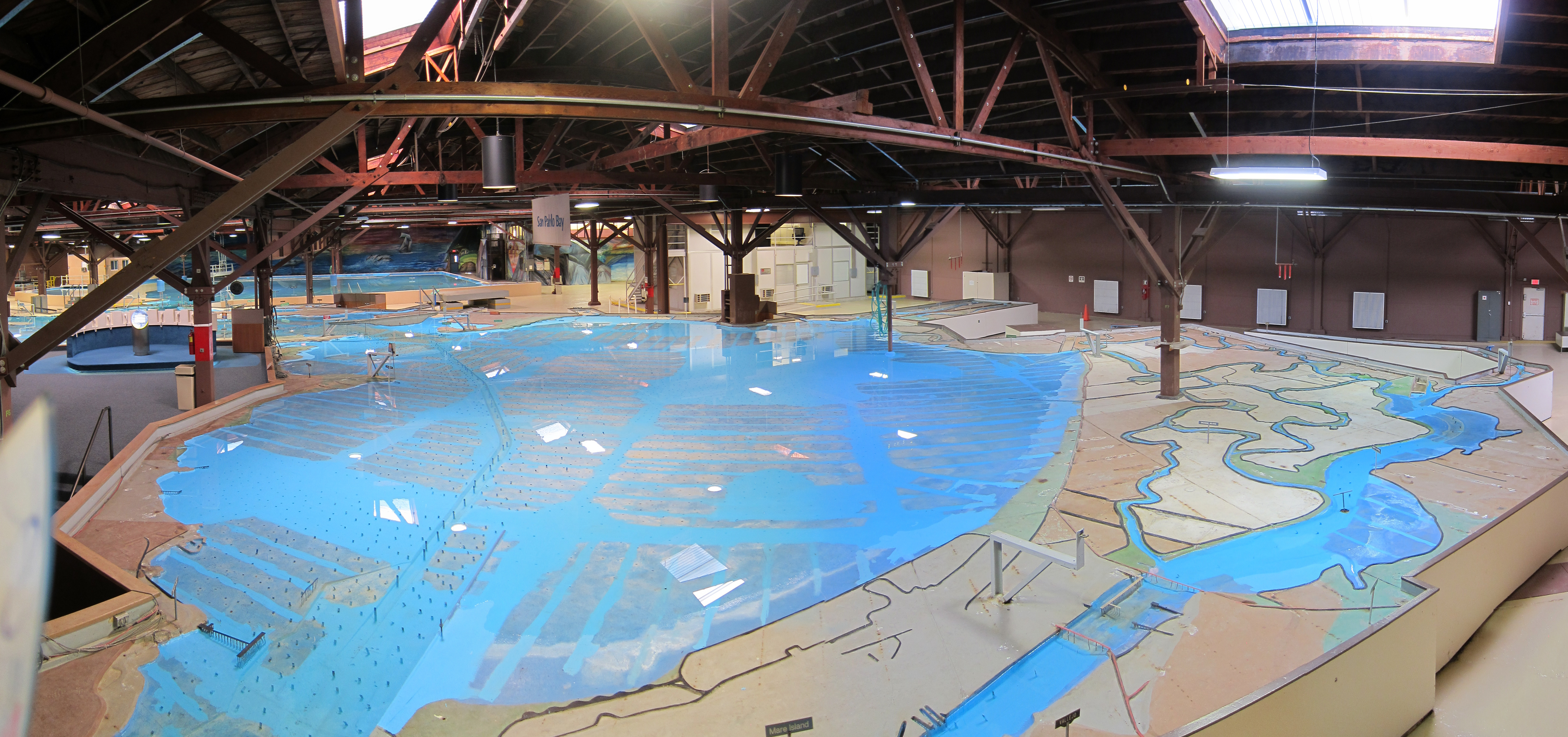
Panorama of the Bay Model focused on the area of the model representing the San Pablo Bay.

== Scale ==
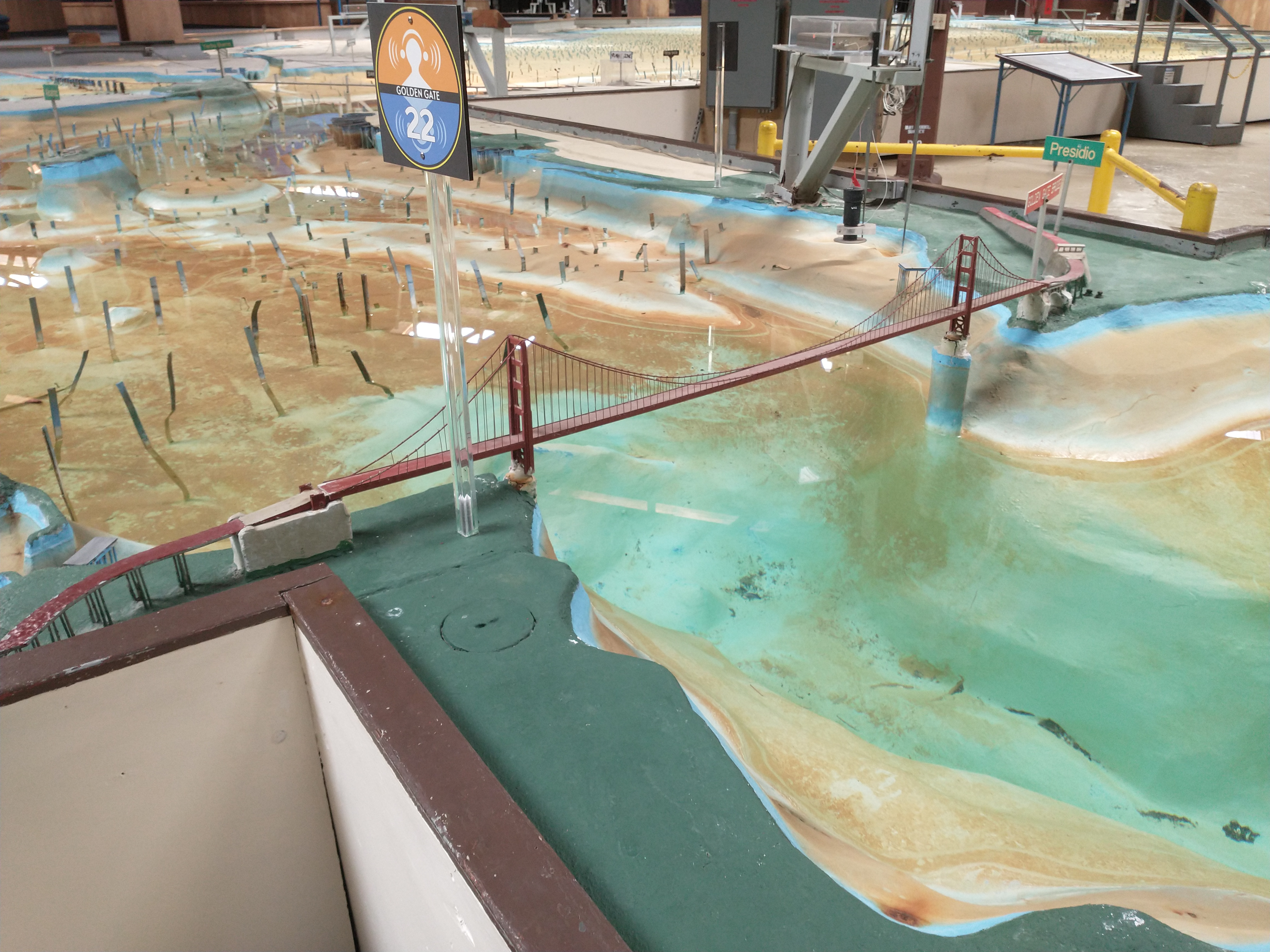
Golden Gate Bridge showing the copper strips in the model

The scale of the model is 1:1000 on the horizontal axis and 1:100 on the vertical axis. The model operates at a time scale of 1:100.

The model is distorted by a factor of ten between the horizontal and vertical scales. The distortion is designed into the model to ensure a proper hydraulic flow over the tidal flats and shallows. The distortion does increase the hydraulic efficiency of the flows. These increased efficiencies are corrected by the use of copper strips throughout the model. The exact number of copper strips is adjusted during the calibration of the model.
