= Transbay Tube =

Underwater rail tunnel under San Francisco Bay

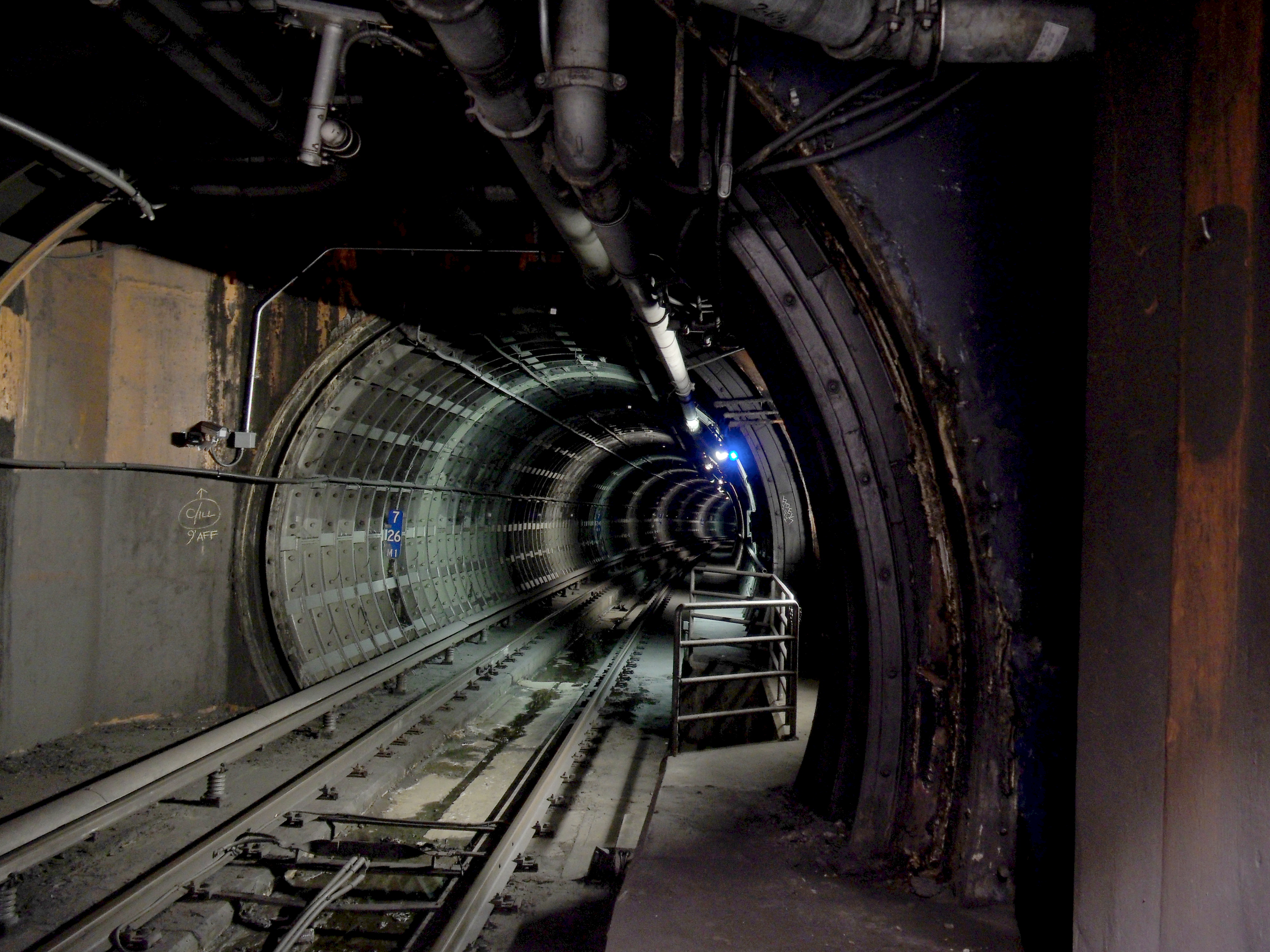
- View into a bored tunnel looking toward the Transbay Tube
- Interactive map of Transbay Tube

Overview
- Line: Yellow Line; Blue Line; Green Line; Red Line
- Location: San Francisco Bay, California, US
- Coordinates: Oakland portal: 37°48′32″N 122°18′58″W
- System: Bay Area Rapid Transit
- Start: Embarcadero station, San Francisco
- End: West Oakland station, Oakland

Operation
- Opened: September 16, 1974
- Owner: San Francisco Bay Area Rapid Transit District
- Character: Rapid transit

Technical
- Line length: 3.6 mi (5.8 km)
- No. of tracks: 2
- Track gauge: 5 ft 6 in (1,676 mm)
- Electrified: Third rail, 1 kV DC
- Operating speed: 80 mph (129 km/h)
- Max elevation: Sea level
- Min elevation: 135 ft (41 m) below sea level

The Transbay Tube is an underwater rail tunnel that carries Bay Area Rapid Transit's four transbay lines under San Francisco Bay between the cities of San Francisco and Oakland in California. The tube is 3.6 miles (5.8 km) long, and attaches to twin bored tunnels. The section of rail between the nearest stations (one of which is underground) totals 6 miles (10 km) in length. The tube has a maximum depth of 135 feet (41 m) below sea level.

Built using the immersed tube technique, the Transbay Tube was constructed on land in 57 sections, transported to the site, and then submerged and fastened to the bottom – primarily by packing its sides with sand and gravel.

Opened in 1974, the tunnel was the final segment of the original BART system to open. All BART lines except the Orange Line operate through the Transbay Tube, making it one of the busiest sections of the system in terms of passenger and train traffic. During peak commute times, over 28,000 passengers per hour travel through the tunnel with headways as short as 2.5 minutes. BART trains can reach their highest speeds in the tube, up to 80 miles per hour (129 km/h), although trains typically operate at 70 miles per hour (113 km/h) unless recovering from a delay.

== Conception and construction ==
=== Early concepts ===
The idea of an underwater rail tunnel traversing San Francisco Bay from Oakland Point was suggested by the San Francisco eccentric Emperor Norton in a proclamation that he issued on May 12, 1872. Emperor Norton issued another proclamation on September 17, 1872, threatening to arrest the city leaders of Oakland and San Francisco for neglecting his earlier proclamation.

Official consideration to the idea was first given in October 1920 by Major General George Washington Goethals, the builder of the Panama Canal. The alignment of Goethals's proposed tube, from the foot of Market St. to the Oakland mole, was almost exactly the same as today's Transbay Tube. His proposal called for building on bay mud, which anticipated some of the seismic design aspects of the finished Transbay Tube, and was estimated to cost up to US$50,000,000 (equivalent to $902,500,000 in 2025). A competing bridge-and-tunnel proposal was advanced in July 1921 by J. Vipond Davies and Ralph Modjeski, closer to the alignment of a proposed Southern Crossing, between Mission Rock and Potrero Point in San Francisco due east to Alameda. Davies and Modjeski were critical of the ventilation issues that would arise from a long combined automobile and rail tunnel, indirectly endorsing the idea of a dedicated tunnel for electric rail traffic. The Davies and Modjeski proposal was joined by twelve other proposed projects to cross the Bay in October 1921, several of which featured rail service through long tunnels.

In 1947, a joint Army-Navy Commission recommended an underwater tube as a means of relieving automobile congestion on the then-ten-year-old Bay Bridge. The recommendation was issued in a report undertaken to determine the feasibility of the Reber Plan.

=== Construction ===
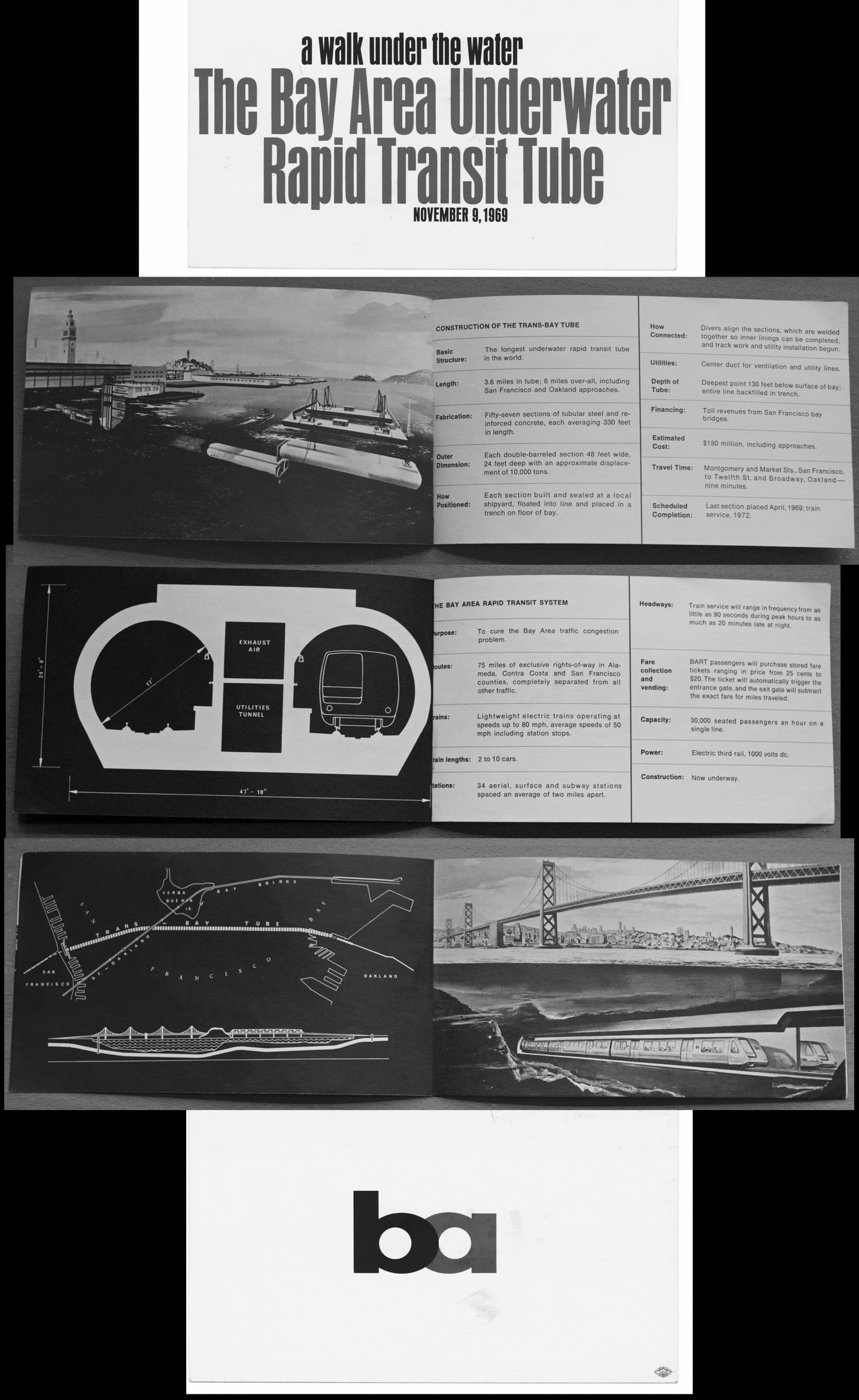
Brochure from November 9, 1969, when a portion of the Tube was open for pedestrian traffic

Seismic studies commenced in 1959, including boring and testing programs in 1960 and 1964, and the installation of an earthquake recording system on the Bay floor. The tube's route was modified after preliminary surveys were unable to identify a continuous bedrock profile, requiring more precise boring and probing of the Bay floor. The route was deliberately chosen to avoid bedrock as much as possible so the tube was free to flex, avoiding concentrated bending stresses.

Design concepts and route alignment were completed by July 1960. A 1961 report estimated the cost of the Transbay Tube at US$132,720,000 (equivalent to $1,429,920,000 in 2025). Construction was started on the tube in 1965, and the structure was completed after the final section was lowered on April 3, 1969. BART sold commemorative bronzed aluminum coins to mark the placement of the final section. Prior to being fitted out, the tube was opened for visitors to walk through a small portion on November 9, 1969. The tracks and electrification needed for the trains were finished in 1973, and the tube was opened to service on September 16, 1974, five years after the originally-projected completion date, after clearing California Public Utilities Commission concerns regarding the automated dispatch system. The first test run was performed by a train under automatic control on August 10, 1973. Train No. 222 ran from West Oakland to Montgomery Street in seven minutes at 68 to 70 miles per hour (109 to 113 km/h) and returned in six minutes at the full speed of 80 miles per hour (130 km/h), carrying approximately 100 passengers including BART officials, dignitaries and reporters.

The tunnel is set in a trench 60 feet (18 m) wide with a gravel foundation 2 feet (0.61 m) deep. Lasers were used to guide the dredging of the trench and the laying of the gravel foundation, maintaining route accuracy of within 3 inches (76 mm) for the trench and 1.8 inches (46 mm) for the foundation. Construction of the trench required dredging 5,600,000 cubic yards (4,300,000 m^{3}) of material from the Bay.

The structure is made of 57 individual sections that were built on land at the Bethlehem Steel shipyard on Pier 70 and towed out into the bay by a large catamaran barge. After the steel shell was completed, water-tight bulkheads were fitted and concrete was poured to form the 2.3-foot (0.70 m)-thick interior walls and track bed. They were then floated into place (positioned above where they were to sit), and the barge was tethered to the Bay floor, acting as a temporary tension leg platform. The section was ballasted with 500 short tons (450 t) of gravel before being lowered into a trench packed with soft soil, mud, and gravel for leveling along the Bay's bottom. Once the section was in place, divers connected the section with the sections that had already been placed underwater, the bulkheads between placed sections were removed and a protective layer of sand and gravel was packed against the sides. Cathodic protection was provided to resist corrosive action from the Bay's salt water.

The project cost approximately $180 million in 1970 (equivalent to $1.12 billion in 2024), with $90 million of that cost being spent on construction, the remainder going towards laying rails, electrification, ventilation and train control systems.

=== Configuration ===
Approximate route of Transbay Tube (shown in yellow). View directed south; Treasure Island in left foreground, San Francisco (Financial District) on the right, and Oakland and Alameda in the left background. (2011)

The western terminus of the Tube directly connects to the downtown Market Street subway near the Ferry Building, north of the Bay Bridge. The tube crosses under the western span of the Bay Bridge between the San Francisco Peninsula and Yerba Buena Island, and emerges in Oakland along 7th Street, west of Interstate 880.

The tube has 57 sections; each section ranges from 273 to 336 feet (83 to 102 m) long. The average length of each section is 328 feet (100 m), measured along the tunnels' bore; sections are 48 feet (15 m) wide, 24 feet (7.3 m) high, and weigh approximately 10,000 short tons (9,100 t) each. To conform with the route, 15 tube sections were curved horizontally, 4 were curved vertically, 2 had horizontal and vertical curves, and the remaining 36 sections were straight. Each section of the Tube cost approximately US$1,500,000 (equivalent to $13,170,000 in 2025), based on the US$90,000,000 (equivalent to $790,150,000 in 2025) construction contract. The steel shell is 5/8 inch (16 mm) thick, and has just enough strength to support its own weight and resist hoop stresses; an external consultant, Professor Ralph Brazelton Peck, convinced project engineer Tom Kuesel that thin shells were adequate because the soil loads would naturally form an arch.

Typical section of the Transbay Tube

The tube consists of two tunnels and a central maintenance/pedestrian gallery. Each tunnel has a bore approximately 17 feet (5.2 m) in diameter, with the track centerline offset 8 inches (200 mm) towards the outside from the bore centerline. The tunnels flank a gallery which contains maintenance and control equipment in the upper gallery, including a pressurized water line for firefighting. Each tunnel has 56 doors opening into the lower gallery, spaced approximately 330 feet (100 m) apart, numbered consecutively from the San Francisco side of the tube. The doors are locked from the gallery side and can be opened inwards (toward the gallery) from the tunnel through emergency hardware. Between doors, the tunnel has narrow 2.5-foot (0.76 m) wide walkways adjacent to the gallery space.

The upper section of the gallery space is also used as a duct, moving 300,000 cubic feet per minute (8,500 m^{3}/min) of air under forced circulation. The tunnels are vented to the atmosphere at the San Francisco and Oakland ends and are vented to each other (through the upper gallery) with remotely-operated dampers 6 feet (1.8 m) long by 3 feet (0.91 m) high over every third door.

Each end of the tube is secured to the vent structures with a patented sliding seismic joint which allows six degrees of freedom (translation along and rotation about three axes). As designed, the joints allow movement of up to 4.25 inches (108 mm) along the tube's axis and up to 6.75 inches (171 mm) vertically or laterally. A restaurant was constructed atop the San Francisco transition structure (vent) on a pier behind the Ferry Building. The Oakland vent structure is located in the middle of a Port of Oakland container yard.

=== Seismic retrofitting ===
The Transbay Tube has required earthquake retrofitting, both on its exterior and in the interior. The total cost of seismic retrofits was estimated at US$330,000,000 (equivalent to $562,500,000 in 2025) in 2004.

A 1991 study, commissioned at the recommendation of the Governor's Board of Inquiry in the wake of the 1989 Loma Prieta earthquake, found the seismic joints would "likely remain intact and functional after the next earthquake." However, settling of the tube within its trench and the Loma Prieta quake had reduced the allowable movement of the seismic joints to as little as 1.5 inches (38 mm).

The 1991 study was followed by a more detailed BART Seismic Vulnerability Study, published in 2002, which concluded the fill packed around the tube might be prone to soil liquefaction during an intense earthquake, which could allow the buoyant hollow tube to break loose from its anchorages or cause movement that would exceed the capacity of the sliding seismic joints. Retrofitting work required the fill to be compacted, to make it denser and less prone to liquefaction. Compaction started in Summer 2006 at the east end of the tube, on property belonging to the Port of Oakland. A 2010 paper concluded the distance the tube would rise due to liquefaction was limited based on model testing of potential liquefaction mechanisms, and questioned the justification for the compaction effort.

On the interior of the tube, BART began a major retrofitting initiative in March 2013, which involved installing heavy steel plates at various locations inside the tube that most needed strengthening, to protect them from sideways movement in an earthquake. A vehicle was custom-built to handle the 4-short-ton (3.6 t), 2.5-inch (64 mm) thick plates; once hoisted in place, the plates were bolted to the existing concrete walls and welded together, end-to-end. The contract for US$7,735,000 (equivalent to $10,847,000 in 2025) was awarded to California Engineering Contractors for installation. In order to complete this work during 2013, BART closed one of the two bores of the tube early midweek (Tuesdays, Wednesdays and Thursdays), resulting in delays of 15–20 minutes. The work, originally estimated to last approximately 14 months, was completed by December 2013, after only 8 months of construction.

In December 2016, BART awarded a US$267,000,000 (equivalent to $358,180,000 in 2025) contract to perform further seismic retrofitting. In this phase, a new steel liner and higher-capacity pumps would be installed to reduce the possibility of flooding the tube, as the existing pumps would not be adequate in the worst-case seismic event. Work was projected to start in the summer of 2018 and is scheduled to take more than two years to complete. Service through the tube would be reduced or eliminated during the first hour and the last three hours of the service day.

== Incidents and issues ==
=== January 1979 fire ===
On January 17, 1979, at approximately 6 p.m., an electrical fire broke out on a San Francisco-bound seven-car train (Train No. 117) as it was passing through the tube. One firefighter (Lt. William Elliott, 50, of the Oakland Fire Department) was killed by smoke and toxic fume inhalation (generated from burning plastic materials) during the effort to extinguish the blaze. The forty passengers and two BART employees aboard the stricken train were rescued by another train passing in the opposite direction. Poor communication and coordination had hampered the response, and the lessons learned during the fire played a key role in developing National Fire Protection Association transit industry guidelines (NFPA 130, Standard for Fixed Guideway Transit and Passenger Rail Systems).

==== Cause ====
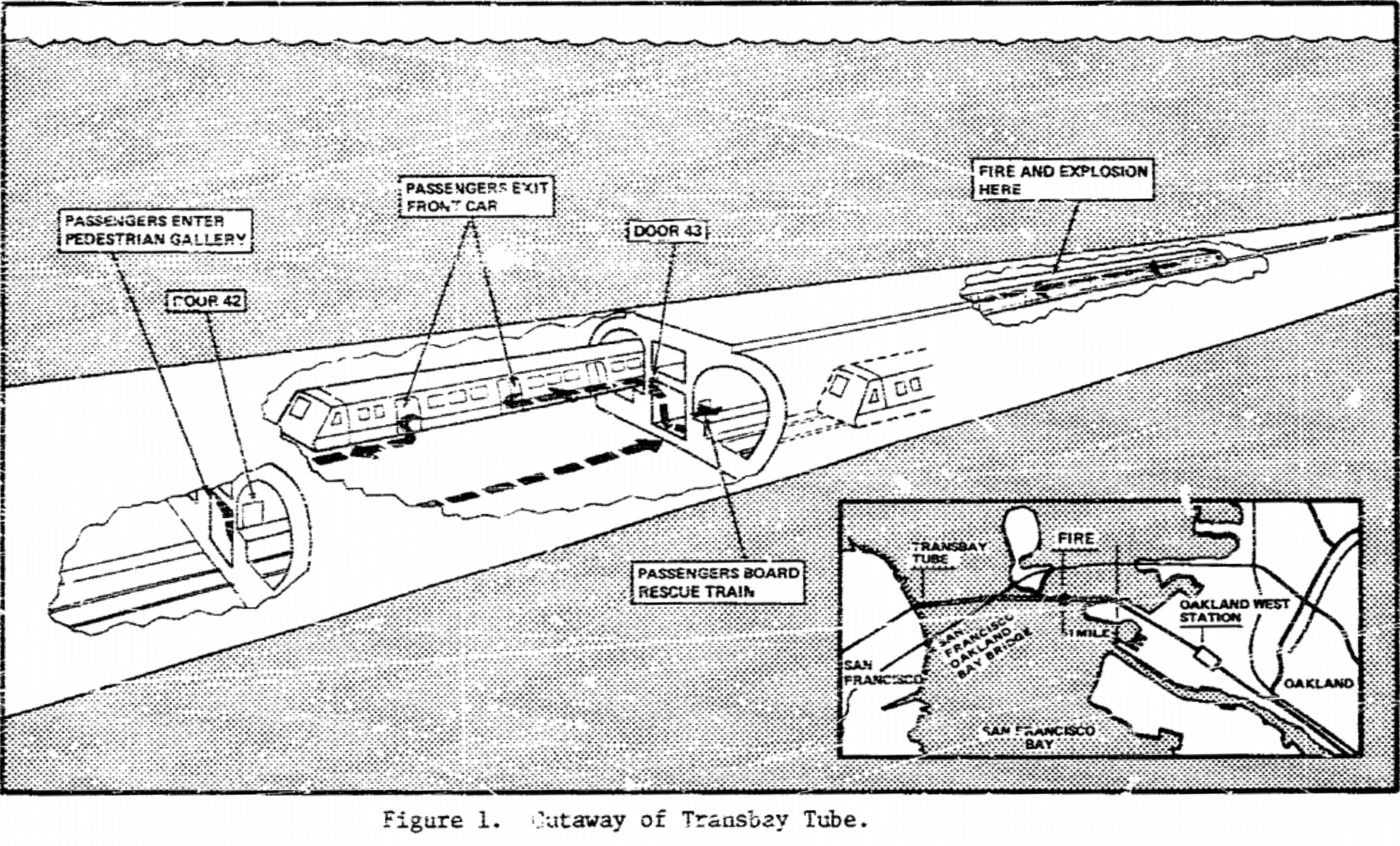
Figure 1: Cutaway of Transbay Tube, a diagram of the rescue, from NTSB RAR-79-05

The cause of the fire was traced to a damaged third rail collector shoe that caused electrical arcing on Train No. 117. Earlier that day, ten-car Train No. 363 had made an emergency stop in the Transbay Tube while traveling towards San Francisco at approximately 4:30 p.m., reporting smoke and a possible fire. Troubleshooting without an external inspection revealed No. 363 had broken derail bars on the number six and eight cars and an engaged parking brake on the number nine car. After clearing the derail bar circuits and manually releasing the parking brake, No. 363 was cleared to proceed and, upon reaching the end of the line in Daly City, was taken out of service for inspection. A line switchbox cover had fallen off No. 363 and was resting on the third rail, which was not seen by following operators until it jammed against the third rail coverboard, breaking the collector shoe on No. 117, which caused a short circuit and electrical arcing.

The train following No. 363 was dispatched to run in road manual mode, in which the train is controlled by the onboard operator, rather than by the computerized central control system. The operator of that train reported seeing derail bar debris between the tracks near where No. 363 had stopped, but that the tracks were clear and available for service. The train immediately following also ran in road manual mode, but subsequent trains were dispatched through the tube in automatic mode, including seven-car No. 117, the tenth train to enter the (normally) westbound tube after No. 363; No. 117 had 40 passengers onboard.

==== Response ====
No. 117 came to an emergency stop at 6:06 p.m., about 1.5 miles (2.4 km) into the Transbay Tube, with the operator reporting thick smoke coming from his train. The collector shoe assemblies on the number five and six cars of No. 117 had broken after striking the line switchbox cover which had fallen off No. 363 and jammed into the cover of the third rail. The NTSB later concluded the resulting electrical arcing between the train and the energized third rail ignited components on the car, causing air tanks and suspension airbags to explode on the fifth and sixth cars. Central operations shut down power to the third rail, but restored it 40 seconds later in an effort to uncouple the lead portion of the train from the burning cars. This was unsuccessful, and vent fans were turned on at 6:08 p.m. to attempt to clear the smoke, and the third rail was again powered down at 6:15 p.m. A BART line supervisor who had been riding on the train helped gather passengers in the lead car, including one blind passenger.

BART central dispatch attempted to call the Oakland Fire Department, but unintentionally called San Francisco instead at 6:09 p.m. The Oakland Fire Department responded to the West Oakland station, where nine firefighters and two BART policemen boarded Train No. 900 running in "road manual." No. 900 was forced to stop at approximately 1 mile (1.6 km) into the tube to remove an auxiliary box cover and a derail bar from the track, and eventually stopped approximately 200 feet (61 m) behind No. 117, where the train operator reported the third rail was damaged and the rear car was on fire with heavy black smoke. Upon reaching No. 117, the responders became separated, with one policeman and seven firefighters proceeding into the gallery between the tunnels, and the rest forced by the smoke to return to No. 900. However, the group in the gallery had left the door (westbound tunnel exit door #44) open to the tunnel for the others to follow; the returning policeman opened a second door (west #45) while setting up a maintenance telephone to communicate with central dispatch, but was forced by the smoke to abandon that position, leaving that door open as well.

Train No. 111, with over 1,000 passengers on board, had been holding at the last San Francisco stop, Embarcadero. At 6:21 p.m., No. 111 moved in automatic mode into the eastbound tunnel, stopping with its rearmost car at eastbound tunnel exit door #43, adjacent to the stricken No. 117. The passengers from No. 117 had been led through the train and out the operator's compartment window in the lead car, then along the smoke-filled westbound tunnel into the gallery via west door #42; they boarded the rescue train (No. 111) through door #43. After the rescued passengers boarded No. 111, firefighters searched No. 117 for any remaining passengers, informing central dispatch at 6:59 p.m. that all passengers had been evacuated. Dispatchers commanded No. 111 to proceed in automatic operation mode to West Oakland to transfer passengers to hospitals. The train quickly accelerated to its top speed of 80 miles per hour (130 km/h) creating pressure in the eastbound tunnel which drew smoke from the westbound tunnel through the open doors (west #44 and #45) into the gallery and the eastbound tunnel (through open eastbound door #43), completely filling the 670 ft-long (200 m) gallery between doors #43 and #45. By this time, 10 more firefighters and a lieutenant had responded, entering the gallery through the Oakland vent structure. Having encountered smoke on their walk in, they had donned portable air masks with 30-minute supplies; they reached the gallery between doors #44 and #45 just as No. 111 departed, rapidly filling the gallery with thick smoke. The tunnel exit doors are locked from the gallery side and require a key to open; with smoke filling the gallery, the keyholes were obscured and the firefighters were unable to evacuate to the eastbound tunnel.

The firefighters began to make their way eastward in the gallery as a single-file human chain, through thick smoke. By the time they reached the area of door #51, their portable air masks were starting to run low, and Lt. William Elliott began to have trouble, requiring assistance from his fellow firefighters. At 7:09 p.m., a firefighter called for help from a phone box and upon reaching a clear section of the tunnel, train No. 377 was dispatched from West Oakland in "road manual" to rescue the firefighters; the train operator moved with passengers on board because she assumed the cause of the delay had been resolved. After the rescue train returned to West Oakland at approximately 8:10 p.m., the firefighters were taken to area hospitals for treatment. Elliott had exhausted his oxygen supply, and died of smoke inhalation and cyanide poisoning.

==== Aftermath ====
The response was delayed in part because of the coordination between BART central dispatch and the two cities' respective fire departments. San Francisco called BART central back at 6:19 p.m., but were advised that Oakland had already responded. Meanwhile, Oakland called San Francisco at 6:32 p.m. to advise them a train was on fire in the tunnel, so San Francisco dispatched a team to wait at Embarcadero at 6:36 p.m., but the San Francisco units did not proceed until 7:52 p.m. and did not arrive until 8:15 p.m. because of the difficulty in obtaining information from either Oakland or BART.

The fire initially was declared under control at 10:45 p.m., although the fires were not yet fully extinguished; a final declaration of control was made at 1:31 a.m. on January 18. Later that day, at approximately 6 p.m., Oakland firefighters responded to flare-up in the gutted train at BART's storage yard. BART would spend US$1,100,000 (equivalent to $4,880,000 in 2025) in tube repairs and safety improvements on top of losing US$1,000,000 (equivalent to $4,440,000 in 2025) in revenue due to the loss of tube service.

Train No. 363 sustained damage to its second, fifth, sixth, eight, and ninth cars. The line switch box cover was missing from the fifth car, and the sixth and eighth cars had broken derail bars. No. 117 had smoke damage to the interior of its first three cars; the fourth car was damaged by smoke and fire, and the fifth, sixth, and seventh cars were destroyed in the fire. No. 900 sustained heat damage to the first car, and all ten cars sustained smoke damage. The tunnel sustained heat damage in the vicinity of the fire; portions of the ceiling concrete had spalled and exposed the reinforcing steel, overhead cables were destroyed, and the steel handrail between doors #43 and #44 had been warped by the heat.

The shutdown of power to the third rail was cited as a possible contributing factor because No. 117 was unable to move in road manual for forty seconds. In addition, the operator and line supervisor aboard No. 117 were unable to uncouple the damaged cars using the existing on-board controls because of an apparent short in the train control circuit; to uncouple the car and isolate the short, someone would have had to leave the train and manually disconnect the electrical cable underneath the coupler to the damaged cars. Critically, nine minutes elapsed between the time that power was restored and when the line supervisor informed BART central they were unable to uncouple the cars, which allowed the fire to grow. On the other hand, the low passenger count and the presence of a line supervisor allowed the passengers to evacuate into the lead car quickly. Dispatching No. 111 with over 1,000 passengers onboard could have resulted in an even larger disaster if the control cables had failed in the eastbound tunnel due to the spread of the fire.

BART proposed new evacuation plans to the San Francisco and Oakland fire chiefs by February, but BART service through the Transbay Tube did not resume until April 1979, with California Public Utilities Commissioner Richard D. Gravelle warning "the patrons of BART who utilize its services should be fully aware that the instant order [to reopen service] does not in any way provide a guarantee of safe service." Both the Oakland and San Francisco fire departments criticized BART officials for failing to relinquish control of the emergency situation to the fire departments.

=== Earthquakes ===
As a precaution, BART's emergency plans dictate that trains stop during an earthquake, except for trains in the Transbay Tube or the Berkeley Hills Tunnel, which proceed to the nearest station. The lines are then inspected for damage, and resume normal operation if no damage is found.

The largest to date was the 1989 Loma Prieta earthquake. During the 1989 earthquake, a train passing through the Tube was ordered to stop, although the operator reported no apparent motion. After inspection, the tube was found to be safe, and was reopened just six hours later, with regular service resuming system-wide twelve hours after the quake. Many area highways were damaged by the event, and with the Bay Bridge closed for a month due to a section of the upper deck falling onto the lower deck on a truss section of the east span, the Transbay Tube was the only passable direct way between San Francisco and Oakland.

=== Pedestrians ===
In October 2012 and August 2013, pedestrians entered the Tube through the Embarcadero station, prompting shutdowns and delays in Transbay service. In late December 2016, a man entered the Tube through the portal at Embarcadero station and remained in it for more than an hour; while transit police were searching for him, trains continued to move through the Tube at slow speeds in manual mode.

=== Equipment failure ===
Service has been disrupted on multiple occasions after trains become stuck in the Transbay Tube, which is partially attributed to aging equipment. In addition to the 1979 fire, while moving through the Tube, a train split and was automatically stopped after a coupler failed in March 2010. Two maintenance vehicles collided within the Tube in September 2014, damaging a section of track and forcing BART traffic to rely on a single track. In January 2015, a train was forced to stop in the Tube after the brake inadvertently engaged on a car. A train in December 2016 was forced to switch to manual mode and proceed at reduced speed after stopping in the Tube, and another faulty brake forced a train to stop in the Tube in April 2017.

=== Noise ===
According to a 2010 survey by the San Francisco Chronicle, the Transbay Tube is the noisiest part of the BART system, with sound pressure levels inside the train reaching 100 decibels (comparable to a jackhammer). The noise, which according to BART "has been compared to banshees, screech owls, or Doctor Who's TARDIS run amok" is exacerbated by the concrete enclosure and the fact that tracks are curved when the tunnel crosses beneath the San Francisco–Oakland Bay Bridge, causing a high-pitched screeching sound. In 2015, after replacing 6,500 feet (2,000 m) and grinding down (smoothing) 3 miles (4.8 km) of rail in the tube, BART reported a reduction of noise and positive feedback from riders.

=== Marine traffic ===
Ship traffic passing through the Bay can damage the anodes used in the Tube's cathodic protection system when dropping anchor. Since the anodes protrude from the filled trench surrounding the Tube, they are more vulnerable to damage. Marine traffic is restricted from dropping anchors when over the Tube, but BART conducts routine inspections for anode damage.

The Tube was closed briefly on January 31, 2014, after a drifting freighter dropped anchor near it at 8:45 a.m. to maintain position. The Coast Guard notified BART officials the anchor appeared to be close to the Tube at 11:55 a.m., based on the ship's position, leading to a suspension of Tube service for approximately 20 minutes while inspections were conducted. No damage was found, and the Tube was reopened at 12:15 p.m. Harbor pilots later noted the ship had anchored 1,200 feet (370 m) southwest of the Tube. Two trains that had been passing through the Tube were stopped in place while the inspection was conducted. Trains were delayed by 15 to 20 minutes, with normal service resuming around 1 p.m.

In April 2017, the derrick barge Vengeance, which was working for BART performing Tube anode maintenance, capsized and sank at night during a late winter storm. The barge came to rest atop the fill overlaying the Transbay Tube, but did not disrupt transit operations. The primary concern was the potential leakage of diesel fuel, and divers had stopped the leak within a day.

== Future ==
In 2007, as BART celebrated the 50th anniversary of its creation, it announced its plans for the next 50 years. Determining the current tunnel will be at its operational capacity by the year 2030, the agency has plans which include a new separate Transbay Tube beneath San Francisco Bay that would run parallel to and south of the existing Transbay Tube. The proposed four-bore tunnel would emerge at the Salesforce Transit Center to provide connecting service to Caltrain and the planned California High-Speed Rail (CHSR) system. The second Tube would provide two tracks for BART trains, and two tracks for conventional/high-speed rail (the BART system and conventional U.S. rail use different and incompatible rail gauges and operate under different sets of safety regulations).

In 2018, BART and CCJPA, the agency responsible for Capitol Corridor commuter rail service, began planning to conduct a feasibility study to narrow the possible alignment options for the proposed second crossing. The study would continue to consider standard-gauge railway options in order to allow connections to Caltrain, CHSR, Capitol Corridor, and potentially other rail services.

In September 2022, two alternative routes were unveiled at a CCJPA meeting, one with a combined tunnel for BART and regional rail, and another route with two separate tunnels.

As of March 2023, a combined four-track tunnel or two separate tunnels for both BART and regular rail are no longer considered cost-effective due to reduced ridership in the Bay Area; planners will research one single tunnel dedicated to either BART service or regional rail service. Link21, the joint organization planning the tunnel, is considering four possible routes, two for regional rail and two for BART extensions. In November 2024, Link21 recommended standard gauge regional rail over BART broad gauge for the tunnel.

The BART Board of Directors approved the Link21 plan in June 2025.

== In media ==
During construction, the Transbay Tube was also used briefly as a shooting location for the ending of George Lucas's film THX 1138. The final vertical climb out to daylight was actually filmed, with the camera rotated 90°, in the incomplete (and decidedly horizontal) Transbay Tube. The scene was filmed before installation of the track supports, with Robert Duvall's character using exposed reinforcing bars as a ladder.

The television adaptation of Terry Brooks's Shannara series of books, The Shannara Chronicles, is partly set in the Bay Area, and part of the journey/quest routes the protagonists through the Transbay Tube.

One of the early sections of the video game Dead Space features a sound sample taken from a ride through the Transbay Tube.

== See also ==
- Key System
- Richmond–San Rafael Bridge: Early proposals by T.A. Tomasini included a tunnel from San Francisco meeting a bridge between Albany and Tiburon.
