= Stark Street Bridge =

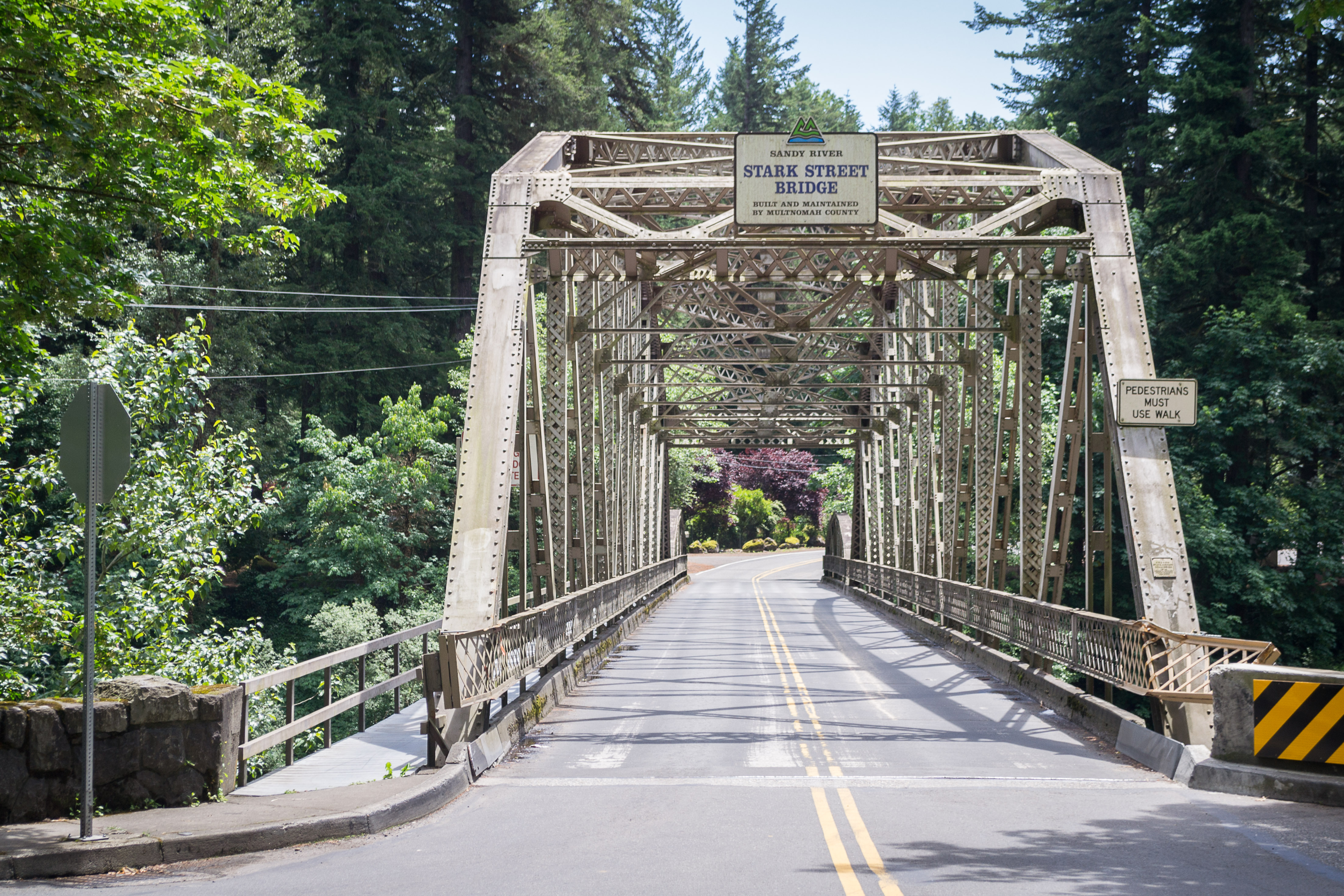
- Coordinates: 45.51533°N 122.36137°W
- Crosses: Sandy River
- Locale: Troutdale, Oregon
- Maintained by: Multnomah County

Characteristics
- Design: Pratt truss
- Total length: 277 ft (84 m)
- Width: 20 ft (6.1 m)
- Longest span: 200 ft (61 m)
- Clearance above: 20 ft (6.1 m)
- Clearance below: 35 ft (11 m)

History
- Opened: January 10, 1915

Location
- Interactive map of Stark Street Bridge

The Stark Street Bridge is a 277-foot (84 m) steel truss bridge spanning the Sandy River two miles east of Troutdale, Oregon. The bridge connects Southeast Stark Street with the Historic Columbia River Highway and is one of only two western entrances to the highway. Karl Billner, who was awarded the Frank P. Brown Medal by the Franklin Institute in 1947, designed the bridge, supervised by State Bridge Engineer Charles H. Purcell. Samuel C. Lancaster provided overall supervision during construction.

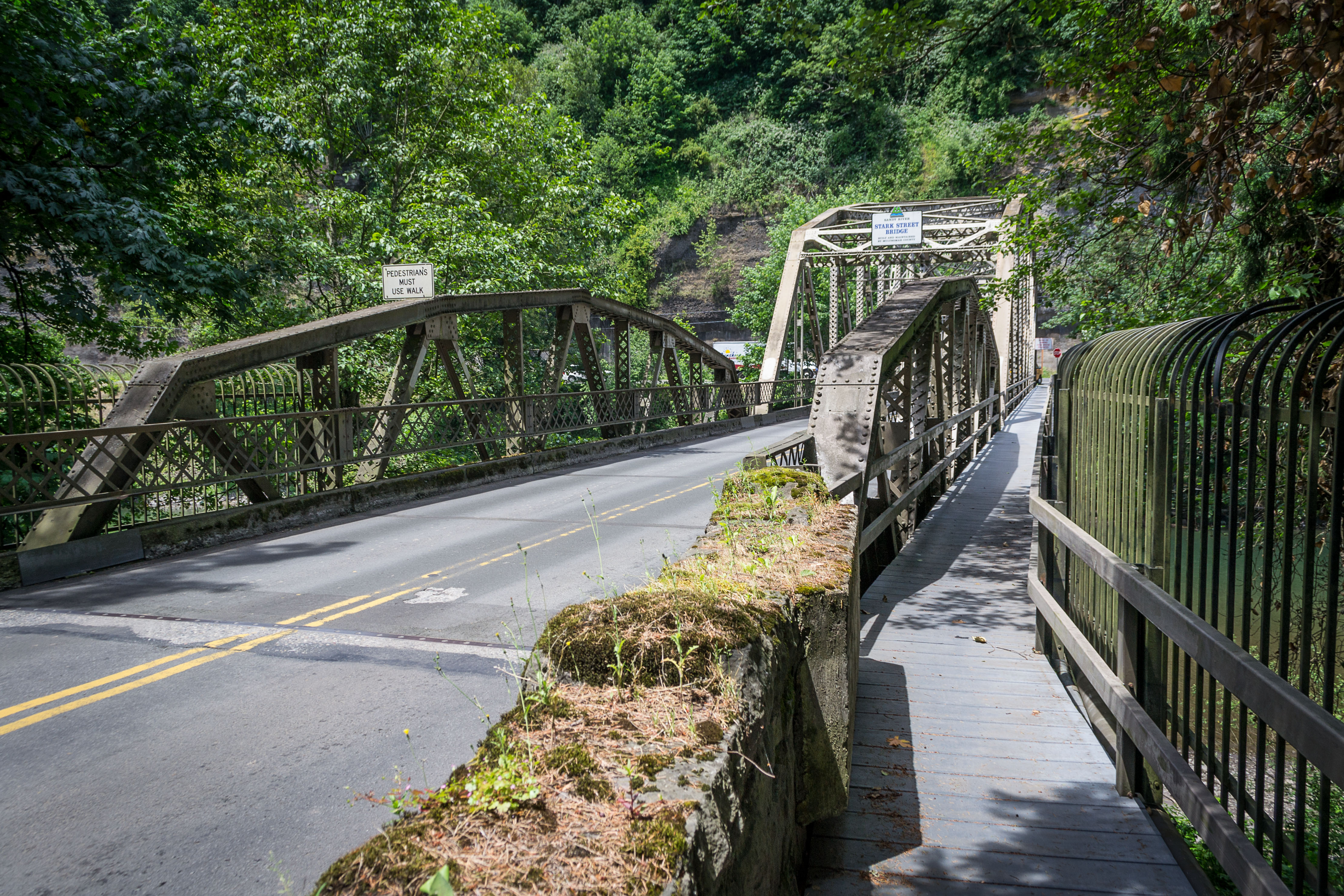
The Warren pony, the Pratt truss, and the pedestrian crossing are visible in this south side view of the Stark Street Bridge

== Description ==
In his 1914 report, Oregon State Highway Engineer Henry Bowlby described the new bridge as follows:

Located two miles from Troutdale, Oregon, over Sandy River, near the Portland Automobile Club House. This bridge replaces an old wooden structure which fell on Good Roads' Day, April 25, 1914, dropping a 5-ton auto truck into the river. Consists of one 200-foot riveted, through, Pratt, camel back steel span, and one 77-foot Warren pony, riveted steel span, with reinforced concrete slab floor, and creosoted wood block pavement. Clearance above low water, 35 feet. Bitumen-filled expansion joints are provided in concrete slab over each floor beam. Clear roadway, 20 feet. Live load, four 20-ton trucks in line, with two 20-ton trucks passing. River pier, 36 feet high above base, of the diamond shaft, solid web type, of reinforced concrete...

Price of bridge, completed, $21,042.40. George H. Griffin, contractor. Will be completed, January 10, 1915.

== See also ==
- List of bridges documented by the Historic American Engineering Record in Oregon
- List of bridges on the National Register of Historic Places in Oregon
