= The Emperor Norton Trust =

Nonprofit

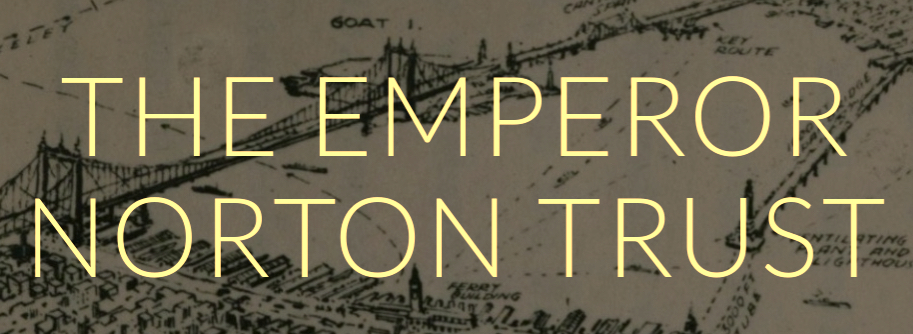
- Formation: 28 September 2013
- Founder: John Lumea
- Type: Nonprofit
- Purpose: To honor the life and advance the legacy of Joshua Abraham Norton (1818–1880), better known as Emperor Norton
- Location(s): San Francisco and Boston
- Website: www.emperornortontrust.org

The Emperor Norton Trust is a nonprofit whose mission is to honor the life and advance the legacy of Joshua Abraham Norton (1818–1880), better known as the 19th-century San Francisco eccentric, Emperor Norton.

Originally known as The Emperor's Bridge Campaign, the Trust was launched in September 2013 as a project to carry forward the call of the August 2013 Change.org petition to name the San Francisco-Oakland Bay Bridge — long known locally simply as "the Bay Bridge" — after Emperor Norton, who set out the original vision for the bridge with three newspaper proclamations published in 1872.

Subsequently, the organization created and has followed a larger public mission that includes research and documentation; education; and advocacy concerning the full life and legacy of Emperor Norton.

The Emperor's Bridge Campaign adopted a new name, The Emperor Norton Trust, in December 2019.

== Background ==
In June 2013, a group of California state lawmakers introduced a resolution in the California State Assembly to name the Western crossing of the state-owned San Francisco-Oakland Bay Bridge — the section from Yerba Buena Island to San Francisco — for former Assembly Speaker and former San Francisco mayor Willie Brown.

Several weeks later, on 1 August 2013, writer John Lumea, then living in San Francisco, wrote and published a Change.org petition calling for the entire Bay Bridge, from Oakland to San Francisco, to be named after Emperor Norton, who in 1872 — with three proclamations published in the African-American-owned abolitionist weekly The Pacific Appeal — called for a bay-spanning suspension bridge linking Oakland to San Francisco via Goat Island, the present-day Yerba Buena Island.

The petition echoed an earlier, 2004 effort in which then-San Francisco Supervisor Aaron Peskin introduced a resolution to the San Francisco Board of Supervisors calling for the Bay Bridge to be named after Emperor Norton. Ultimately, the resolution passed by the Board called for only the bridge's new Eastern crossing — the "Oakland side," then in the early planning stages — to be named after Norton. This suggestion was not well received by the Oakland City Council, and the idea went no further.

In the six weeks from the launch of the Change.org petition until the final California State Senate vote approving the resolution naming the Bay Bridge's Western crossing for Willie Brown, the petition attracted 3,800 signatures. It also received media coverage from the San Francisco Chronicle, San Francisco Bay Guardian, KQED (Bay Area NPR affiliate), SFist, Laughing Squid, San Jose Mercury News and the Los Angeles Times, among others.

The petition remains open and currently is at nearly 6,700 signatures.

== Origins and first year ==
Encouraged by this response, Lumea set up a Facebook group on 26 August 2013 for a potential new organization that he called "The Emperor's Bridge Campaign."

A launch party for the effort was held on 28 September 2013 at Emperor Norton's Boozeland, an Emperor Norton-themed bar in San Francisco.

Over the course of its first year, the Campaign continued to engage in the call to name the Bay Bridge after Emperor Norton. The organization identified a couple of state naming practices that it used to develop a naming approach that it saw as a more politically and financially realistic than a wholesale "renaming" of the bridge. Specifically, the Campaign observed: (1) while the State of California recognizes "Willie L. Brown, Jr., Bridge" as the official name for the Bay Bridge's Western crossing, the state also — separately and independently — continues to recognize the unofficial name "San Francisco-Oakland Bay Bridge" for the entire bridge system. (2) There exists the precedent of state-owned bridges for which the State of California recognizes multiple names, either multiple official names or some combination of official and unofficial names.

On this basis, the organization introduced the option of simply adding "Emperor Norton Bridge" as an honorary name for the Bay Bridge, leaving in place all existing names for the bridge and its parts (spans, tunnel, pedestrian/bike path, etc.).

While The Emperor's Bridge Campaign remained active on the bridge-naming front, it expanded its mission to include historical research and documentation, and public education, about the full life and legacy of Emperor Norton.

Via its Web site and social media channels (Facebook and Twitter), as well as in public talks, the Campaign began to document its historical discoveries about Emperor Norton and to highlight art, music, film and other creative efforts that are inspired by him.

The Emperor's Bridge Campaign also began to produce public commemorative events to mark and celebrate various aspects of the Emperor Norton story.

The Campaign incorporated as a nonprofit in late 2014.

== Research program ==
Since launching the organization in 2013, founder John Lumea has written and published more than 200 research articles on different aspects of Emperor Norton's life and legacy.

Lumea's research has garnered particular attention in three areas of general interest:

=== Emperor Norton's birth date ===
When Emperor Norton's remains were moved in 1934 from their original resting place at the Masonic cemetery, in San Francisco, to Woodlawn cemetery, in Colma, Calif., a new granite headstone was created that memorializes 1819 as his birth year. Over time, Emperor Norton's grave has become a frequently photographed pilgrimage site, and this has shaped the conventional wisdom about when Norton was born.

But, the two later book-length works about Emperor Norton — Allen Stanley Lane's Emperor Norton: The Mad Monarch of America (1939) and William Drury's Norton I: Emperor of the United States (1986) — maintain that Norton was born in 1818.

In late 2014 and early 2015, The Emperor's Bridge Campaign undertook its first large project of original research: an effort to pin down Emperor Norton's precise birth date. At an event in February 2015, Lumea presented the Campaign's case for 4 February 1818 as the most likely date.

Based on this research, the Campaign in January–March 2018 produced Emperor Norton at 200, a 6-week series of talks, exhibits and special events in San Francisco celebrating the Norton bicentennial. In co-producing specific events, the organization was joined by the California Historical Society, the Mechanics' Institute, the San Francisco Public Library and the Society of California Pioneers. At the Campaign's request, the City and County of San Francisco lit both San Francisco City Hall and Coit Tower in gold on 4 February 2018.

In March 2020, the Campaign — newly renamed The Emperor Norton Trust — presented its research to the Library of Congress, which responded by changing its official birth information for Emperor Norton (Joshua Abraham Norton) from "1819" to "1818" and specifically to "1818-02-04", reflecting the specific birth date.

=== Printers of Emperor Norton's bonds ===
In May 2017, Lumea published an essay on the two printers of the promissory notes that Emperor Norton sold from 1870 until his death in 1880: Cuddy & Hughes and Charles A. Murdock & Co. Cuddy & Hughes also was the printer of the Pacific Appeal newspaper during the period, 1870–1875, when the paper published some 250 of Norton's proclamations.

Reporting on this and related research by Lumea has been the Numismatic Bibliomania Society, a nonprofit, founded in 1980, that advances numismatic scholarship, i.e., research on historical currency and coin. In the case of Emperor Norton, NBS's interest extends to Norton-related ephemera.

In October 2018, Heritage Auctions cited Lumea's May 2017 essay (see above) in its listing of a July 1878 Emperor Norton note.

=== "Frisco" ===
One of the most frequently told stories about Emperor Norton is that he authored a proclamation railing against the word "Frisco" and imposing a $25 fine against anyone heard using it.

In February 2016, Lumea wrote and published a long essay debunking this claim.

Mother Jones magazine deputy editor Dave Gilson called the essay "the definitive account of the phony decree."

After repeating the anti-"Frisco" proclamation claim in his 19 September 2020 history column for the San Francisco Chronicle, author and journalist Gary Kamiya issued a correction in his 3 October 2020 column and cited Lumea and The Emperor Norton Trust as the authority for saying that, in fact, "no primary documents have been found to support this claim."

== Archive of Emperor Norton in the Arts (ARENA) ==
July 2016 saw the debut of the Trust's digital Archive of Emperor Norton in Art, Music & Film (ARENA).

The Archive's chronologically arranged Visual Arts galleries now display annotated images of nearly 235 engravings, paintings and drawings; comics; and sculptures and fabrications of Emperor Norton dating from 1861 to the present.

In April 2017, the organization partnered with the Internet Archive to make available four dramatic films of the Emperor Norton story: three television episodes from the 1950s' and '60s and a 1936 Columbia Pictures film short that appears to be the earliest extant film portrayal of Norton. The Internet Archive digitized the 1936 film from a rare 16mm copy of the film in the Trust's collection. All four films can be streamed via the websites of both organizations.

In April 2025, the Trust updated the name of the collection to the Archive of Emperor Norton in the Arts (ARENA).

== Emperor Norton Map of the World ==
In July 2017, the organization introduced its Emperor Norton Map of the World. This digital, interactive, annotated map now features more than 105 pinned sites in England, South Africa and California where Emperor Norton is documented to have lived, worked or visited. Each pin includes a description, and most have images and links.

The map also includes 11 sites with Emperor-themed works of art.

== New name and "expansion" to Boston ==
In December 2019, The Emperor's Bridge Campaign adopted a new name, The Emperor Norton Trust, to better reflect its mission and its full range of activities.

The name change was in anticipation of founder John Lumea's planned move to Boston, where he relocated in February 2020.

A group of seven Advisors remains in San Francisco and the greater Bay Area.

== "Emperor Norton Bridge" advocacy, 2013–present ==
Given the Emperor Norton's Trust's broad program of activities, the organization has focused its advocacy to add "Emperor Norton Bridge" as an honorary name for the San Francisco-Oakland Bay Bridge primarily on those years that line up with significant "Nortonian" anniversaries.

After its initial honorary naming push of 2013 — which coincided with John Lumea's Change.org petition of August 2013 — the organization pushed again in 2018, the bicentennial of Emperor Norton's birth, and made another, smaller push in 2019, the 160th anniversary of Joshua Norton's original Proclamation of 1859.

Most recently, the organization sought to sponsor a state legislative resolution that would take effect in 2022, the 150th anniversary of Emperor Norton's proclamations of 1872 setting out the original vision for the bridge. The legislature did not take up the issue in its 2022 session.

In October 22, the Trust suspended its effort to have the entire Bay Bridge named after the Emperor.

=== A pivot to the "Emperor Norton Tunnel" ===
After successive efforts to build support for naming the San Francisco Ferry Building clock tower "Emperor Norton Tower" in 2023, the 125th anniversary of building, and in 2024, the 175th anniversary of Joshua Norton's arrival in San Francisco, The Emperor Norton Trust returned to the Bay Bridge.

In August 2025, the Trust introduced a proposal that the California state legislature name the bridge's Yerba Buena Tunnel (through Yerba Buena Island) "Emperor Norton Tunnel" in 2026 — the 90th anniversary of the bridge and the 180th anniversary of Emperor Norton's original arrival in the United States in 1846.

In August 2026, California State Senator Scott Wiener adopted and advanced this proposal as Senate Concurrent Resolution 193. The resolution was co-authored by Assemblymember Catherine Stefani. The Trust was the citizen sponsor.

SCR 193 passed the Senate unanimously, 39–0. But, under Assembly rules that put up high bars to expediting any measure in the final two weeks of the session, SCR 193 received neither committee nor floor votes in the Assembly.

The Emperor Norton Trust has announced its commitment to seeing this resolution reintroduced in the 2027–2028 legislative session, which opens December 2026.
