= Salt Water Barrier (Delaware River) =

Coordinates: 39°38′53″N 75°33′26″W

The Salt Water Barrier was a proposed project on the estuary of the Delaware River, which was projected in the late 1950s to convert the lower reaches of the Delaware into a freshwater lake. The barrier was proposed as a 30-foot (9.1 m) high dam near New Castle, Delaware, 53,300 feet (16,200 m) long, equipped with locks for the passage of shipping to Wilmington and Philadelphia. A study for the project was authorized by Congress in 1958, with engineering evaluations and public hearings by the U.S. Army Corps of Engineers. The prime purpose of the project was to develop the lower river as a source of drinking water for communities along the lower river. Objections to the barrier included concerns about the oyster industry, shipping constraints, increased shoaling, ice formation, and most importantly, the possibility of trapping pollutants above the barrier. The project was found to be technically feasible, but not economically practical. It was not included in the final Delaware River Basin Report of 1962, which proposed reservoirs higher in the Delaware River basin, and no further action was taken.

== Description ==
The impoundment was to be located just upstream of the eastern terminus of the Chesapeake and Delaware Canal, south of New Castle, so that the canal could remain at sea-level. Studies examined problems of ship passage, which would necessitate a system to flush the locks with pumped water to prevent salt water contamination. The study indicated that in the absence of regular tidal flushing there would be a buildup of pollutants in the impoundment that would render the fresh water reservoir unusable.

The barrier itself was proposed as a low dike built using hydraulic fill, armored against storms with concrete paving. An overflow spillway was to be set in a section of concrete structure, adjacent to four navigation locks that could accommodate vessels of more than 40-foot (12 m) draft.

A 13-foot (4.0 m) diameter tunnel was proposed to carry water from an intake structure near New Castle at a depth of about 400 feet (120 m) for 39,000 feet (12,000 m) in populated areas, or in a cut-and-cover trench in rural areas over 60,000 feet (18,000 m) to Hoopes Reservoir above Wilmington. Costs were projected in 1960 to be about $345,000,000 for the barrier, and between $35,000,000 and $45,000,000 for water tunnels. Costs for an alternative intake from the reservoir behind the existing Conowingo Dam on the Susquehanna River were estimated to be between $140,000,000 and $170,000,000. Annual costs were estimated in the same proportion as the differences between the projects.

== See also ==
- Reber Plan, a similar proposal for San Francisco Bay
