= Little Meadows, Pennsylvania =

Borough in Pennsylvania, US

- Borough
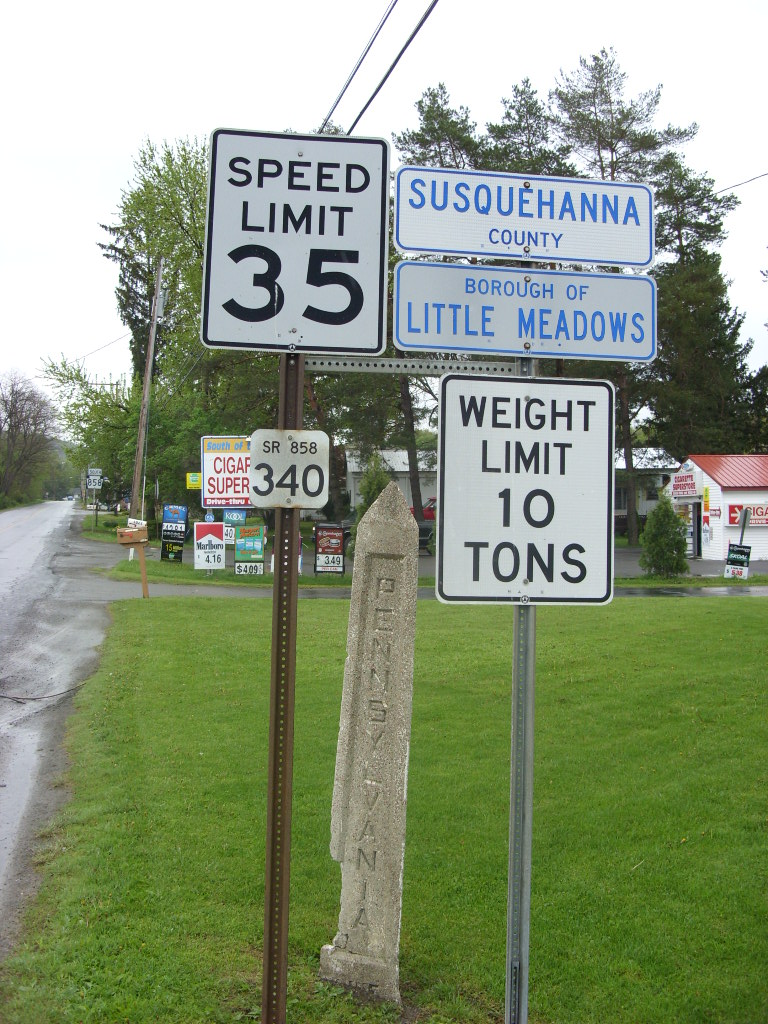
- Entering Little Meadows from New York

- Location of Little Meadows in Susquehanna County, Pennsylvania.

- Location within Pennsylvania Location within the United States
- Coordinates: 41°59′27″N 76°08′01″W
- Country: United States
- State: Pennsylvania
- County: Susquehanna
- Settled: 1800
- Incorporated: 1860

Area
  - Total: 2.42 sq mi (6.26 km^{2})
  - Land: 2.42 sq mi (6.26 km^{2})
  - Water: 0 sq mi (0.00 km^{2})

Population (2020)
  - Total: 245
  - Density: 101.3/sq mi (39.13/km^{2})
- Time zone: UTC-5 (Eastern (EST))
  - Summer (DST): UTC-4 (EDT)
- Zip code: 18830
- Area code: 570
- FIPS code: 42-43928

Little Meadows is a borough in Susquehanna County, Pennsylvania, United States. The population was 247 at the 2020 census.

== Geography ==
Little Meadows is located at 41°59′27″N 76°8′1″W (41.990869, -76.133521).

According to the United States Census Bureau, the borough has a total area of 2.4 square miles (6.2 km^{2}), all land.

== Demographics ==
Historical population
Census	Pop.	Note	%±
1870	133		—
1880	159		19.5%
1890	223		40.3%
1900	213		−4.5%
1910	156		−26.8%
1920	119		−23.7%
1930	136		14.3%
1940	156		14.7%
1950	196		25.6%
1960	301		53.6%
1970	337		12.0%
1980	375		11.3%
1990	326		−13.1%
2000	290		−11.0%
2010	273		−5.9%
2020	245		−10.3%
2021 (est.)	248	▲	1.2%

As of the census of 2010, there were 273 people, 119 households, and 76 families residing in the borough. The population density was 113.8 people per square mile (43.9 people/km^{2}). There were 134 housing units at an average density of 55.8 per square mile (21.5/km^{2}). The racial makeup of the borough was 99.2% White, 0.4% Asian, and 0.4% from two or more races. Hispanic or Latino of any race were 1.5% of the population.

There were 119 households, out of which 18.5% had children under the age of 18 living with them, 54.6% were married couples living together, 6.7% had a female householder with no husband present, and 36.1% were non-families. 29.4% of all households were made up of individuals, and 11% had someone living alone who was 65 years of age or older. The average household size was 2.29 and the average family size was 2.76.

In the borough the population was spread out, with 16.1% under the age of 18, 60.1% from 18 to 64, and 23.8% who were 65 years of age or older. The median age was 52.3 years.

The median income for a household in the borough was $48,235, and the median income for a family was $85,156. Males had a median income of $40,833 versus $25,909 for females. The per capita income for the borough was $26,027. About 9.4% of families and 14.6% of the population were below the poverty line, including 21.9% of those under the age of eighteen and 4.5% of those 65 or over.

== Notable people ==
Glenn B. Woodruff, the design engineer for the San Francisco-Oakland Bay Bridge and Mackinac Bridge in Michigan was born in Little Meadows on February 8, 1890.
