= Charles H. Purcell =

American civil engineer (1883–1951)

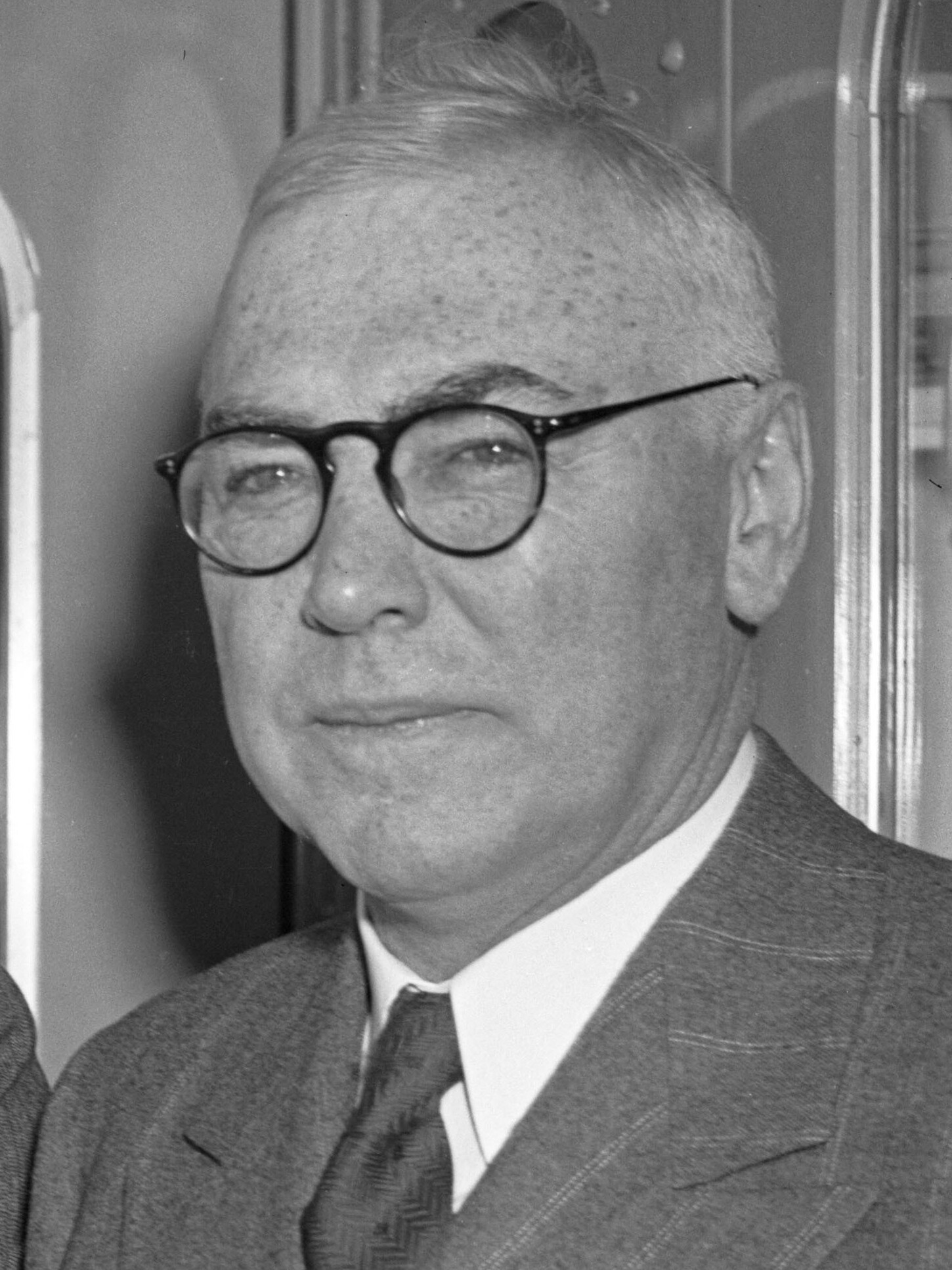
- Purcell in 1939
- Born: 27 January 1883; North Bend, Nebraska, U.S.
- Died: 7 September 1951 (aged 68); Sacramento, California, U.S.
- Burial place: East Lawn Memorial Park
- Occupation: Civil engineer
- Known for: Chief engineer of the San Francisco–Oakland Bay Bridge

Charles Henry Purcell (27 January 1883 – 7 September 1951) was one of the most distinguished civil engineers in the United States during the 20th century. He was the chief engineer of the San Francisco – Oakland Bay Bridge, which was his most notable design. The American Society of Civil Engineers selected the Bay Bridge as one of the seven modern civil engineering wonders of the United States in 1955. As California Director of Public Works, he oversaw construction of the first freeway in the American West. He also oversaw design of the first stack interchange in the world, the Four Level Interchange just north of downtown Los Angeles. He played an instrumental role on the National Interregional Highway Committee which persuaded Congress to authorize the Interstate Highway System. He worked primarily in the public sector on the United States west coast throughout his life.

== Biography ==
=== Personal life and education ===
Purcell was born in North Bend, Nebraska, one of two children of John and Mary Gillis Purcell. His father died when he was 3, and as he grew up, Purcell developed a fascination with bridges. He was educated in civil engineering at Stanford University (for one semester) and at the University of Nebraska–Lincoln where he specialized in bridge design. He married Minnie Pullen in 1914, the daughter of a Portland, Oregon farmer. They had no children.

=== Early work ===
After graduating in 1906, he worked at a variety of jobs in ten different locations. His first full-time position was with the Union Pacific Railroad, during which he built a steel girder span in Wyoming, his first bridge. He then went to Peru for two years as an engineer for mines in the Cerro de Pasco area. He returned to the United States as chief engineer for a logging railroad in Oregon. He then supervised the construction of bridges and highways in several states, mostly in the Pacific Northwest.

When he was hired as Oregon's first state bridge engineer in 1913, he was an advocate for concrete bridges, but had to overcome considerable opposition from companies who built steel bridges, which had been the principle bridge construction method for many years. In 1914 he completed Oregon's first paved highway, and three years later he designed and built the innovative 170 feet (52 m)-long concrete arch Center Street Bridge in Salem, Oregon, over the Willamette River. During his tenure, he supervised bridge projects along the Historic Columbia River Highway and a number of smaller bridges throughout the state. He established Oregon's first statewide bridge design department. After he left employment with the state of Oregon in 1918, he became a District Engineer for U.S. Bureau of Public Roads.

== Professional accomplishments ==
=== Built San Francisco–Oakland Bay Bridge ===
In 1928, Purcell was appointed by Governor C. C. Young as the California State Highway Engineer. In 1929, he was appointed technical adviser to the 1929 Hoover-Young San Francisco-Oakland Bay Bridge Commission, which commissioned construction of the 8.25 miles (13.28 km)-long San Francisco–Oakland Bay Bridge. When the commission finished its work, Purcell was appointed by Governor Jim Rolph as the Chief Engineer responsible for the design and construction of the bridge. During construction, the project was held up by the maritime strikes of 1934. Despite these and many other challenges, the bridge was completed several months ahead of schedule. The western portion of the bridge relied on a central 500 feet (150 m)-tall anchorage, 220 feet (67 m) of which is beneath the surface of the water. It is the world's largest pier. The 540 feet (160 m) tunnel through Yerba Buena Island was at the time the largest bore tunnel in the world. Its completion was the realization of dreams first conceived by local citizens in 1850. Upon its completion, it was the longest and at $77,600,000, the most expensive bridge ever built. More than 6,500 employees worked on the project.

=== Designed state freeway system ===
Purcell continued as California State Highway Engineer through 1942, when he was promoted by Governor Earl Warren to Public Works Director for the entire state. From the time he became State Highway Engineer in 1928 until he retired as Director of Public Works in 1951, he oversaw tremendous improvements to the California highway system. This included transforming 4,800 miles (7,700 km) of largely rural main roads to 14,000 miles (23,000 km) of vastly improved rural and urban highways. Included among the 640 miles (1,030 km) of metropolitan freeways he was responsible for constructing was the Pasadena Freeway, the first freeway in the American West, finished in 1940. He also oversaw design of the Four Level Interchange just north of downtown Los Angeles, the first stack interchange in the world. Completed in 1949, it was not fully used until 1953 when a needed interchange was opened. Purcell established California as a pioneer in metropolitan freeway development and his work anticipated interstate highway design standards by more than 10 years.

== Recognition and honors ==
Purcell served on presidential commissions and was elected as President of the American Association of State Highway Officials. In 1937, he was appointed by the U.S. Secretary of Agriculture to a federal Committee on Planning and Design Policies. In 1941 President Franklin Roosevelt selected him to serve on the National Interregional Highway Committee, whose final report persuaded Congress to authorize the Interstate Highway System. He was awarded the prestigious Bartlett Award in 1944 by the American Road Builders Association and the Highway Research Board.

In November 1955, the American Society of Civil Engineers selected the Bay Bridge as one of the seven modern civil engineering wonders of the United States. The Sacramento Bee, referring to the San Francisco–Oakland Bay Bridge, commented upon his retirement, "It can be said that if the bridge is a monument to any single individual, that honor should go to Purcell."

He died at his home in Sacramento on 7 September 1951 at age 68 after a brief illness, just five weeks after he retired. He was buried at East Lawn Memorial Park.

== Bridge projects ==
Most of Purcell's bridge projects are still open to traffic with the exception of those noted below.

- Bridal Veil Creek Bridge (Multnomah County, Oregon) Bridge Engineer – 1914
- Dollarhide Bridge (Jackson County, Oregon) Bridge Engineer – 1914
- Eagle Creek Bridge (Multnomah County, Oregon) Bridge Engineer – 1914
- East Multnomah Falls Viaduct (Multnomah County, Oregon) Bridge Engineer – 1914
- Horsetail Creek Bridge (Multnomah County, Oregon) Bridge Engineer – 1914
- Latourell Creek Bridge (Multnomah County, Oregon) Bridge Engineer – 1914
- Milton Way Bridge (Columbia County, Oregon) Bridge Engineer – 1914 (replaced)
- Multnomah Creek Bridge (Multnomah County, Oregon) Bridge Engineer – 1914
- Oneonta Creek Bridge (Multnomah County, Oregon) Bridge Engineer – 1914
- Shepperds Dell Bridge (Multnomah County, Oregon) Bridge Engineer – 1914
- Stark Street Bridge (Multnomah County, Oregon) Bridge Engineer – 1914
- Steinman Overcrossing (Jackson County, Oregon) Bridge Engineer – 1914
- West Multnomah Falls Viaduct (Multnomah County, Oregon) Bridge Engineer – 1914
- McCord Creek Bridge (Multnomah County, Oregon) Bridge Engineer – 1915 (replaced)
- Moffett Creek Bridge (Multnomah County, Oregon) Bridge Engineer – 1915
- Tanner Creek Bridge (Multnomah County, Oregon) Bridge Engineer – 1915
- Center Street Bridge (Marion County, Oregon) Bridge Engineer – 1918 (replaced)
- Shasta River Bridge (Siskiyou County, California) Built – 1928
- South Fork Trinity River Bridge (Humboldt County, California) State Bridge Engineer – 1929 (replaced)
- Bixby Creek Bridge (Monterey County, California) Highway Engineer – 1932
- San Francisco - Oakland Bay Bridge (Alameda County, California) Chief Engineer – 1936
