= Reber Plan =

San Francisco Bay damming project

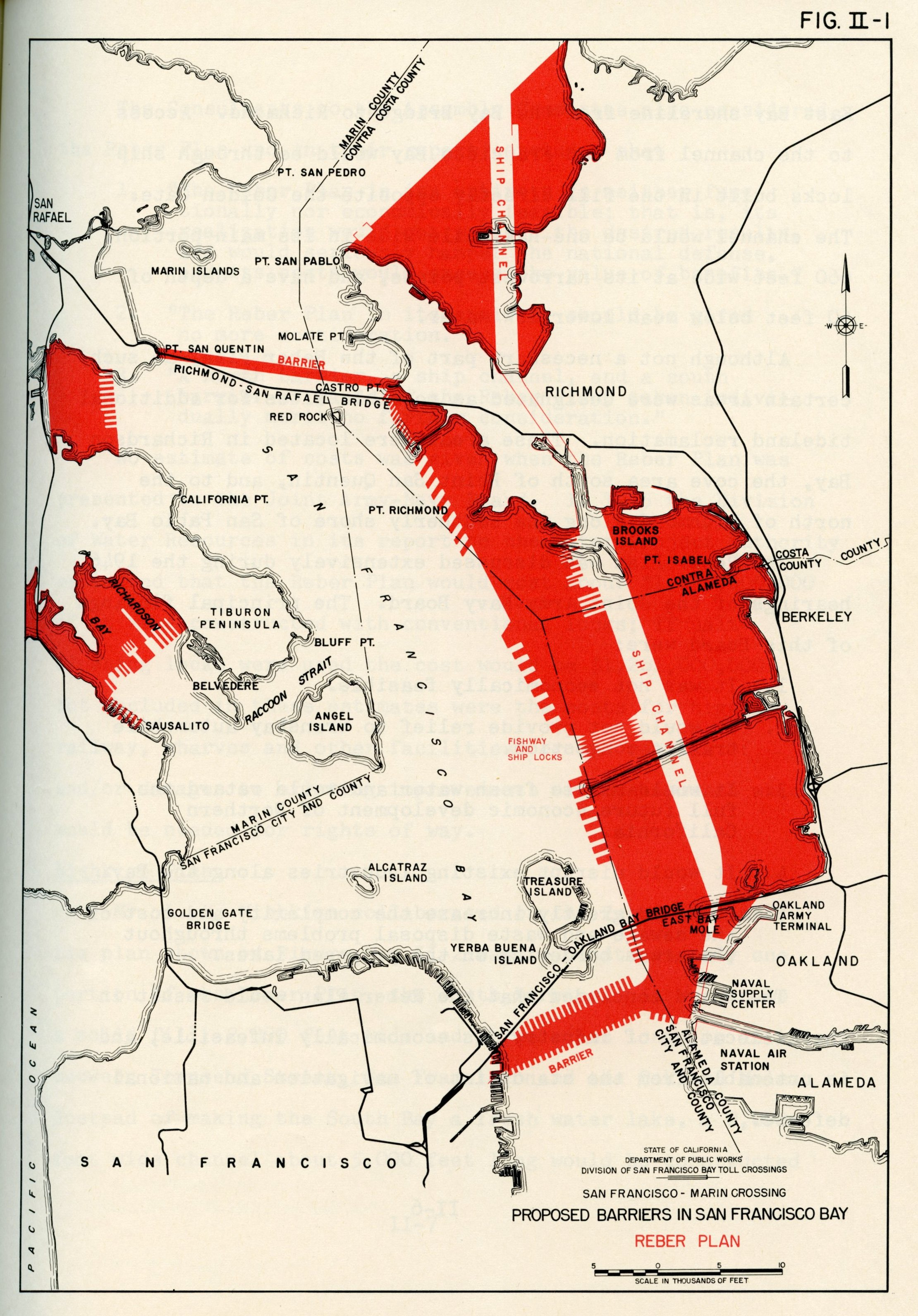
Proposed barriers in the San Francisco Bay

The Reber Plan was a late 1940s plan to fill in parts of the San Francisco Bay. It was designed and advocated by John Reber—an actor and theatrical producer.

== San Francisco Bay Project ==
Under the plan, which was also known as the San Francisco Bay Project, the mouth of the Sacramento River (from Suisun Bay) would be channelized by dams and would feed two vast freshwater lakes within the bay, providing drinking and irrigation water to the residents and farmers of the Bay Area. The barriers would support rail and highway traffic and would create the two freshwater lakes. Between the lakes, Reber proposed the reclamation of 20,000 acres (81 km^{2}) of land that would be crossed by a freshwater channel. West of the channel would be airports, a naval base, and a pair of locks comparable in size to those of the Panama Canal. Industrial plants would be developed on the east.

The San Francisco Chronicle endorsed the plan's concept of a causeway to replace or supplement the San Francisco Bay Bridge, stating:

There are a great many difficulties to be surmounted, just as there were for the Bay and Golden Gate bridges, but they can be surmounted by application of the same kind of drive and technical know-how that brought the present great spans into being.

== Feasibility tested ==
In 1946, the Alameda County Committee for a Second Bay Crossing and noted civil engineer Glenn B. Woodruff estimated the plan would cost $2.5 billion, more than 10 times Reber's estimate. Woodruff, who had helped design the San Francisco-Oakland Bay Bridge, blamed a misunderstanding of the geology of the bay for the massive discrepancy.

In 1953 the U.S. Army Corps of Engineers recommended more detailed study of the plan and eventually constructed a hydraulic model of the Bay Area to test it. The barriers, which were the plan's essential element, failed to survive this critical study. The scrapping of the Reber Plan in the early 1960s was one sign, perhaps, of the end of an era of grandiose civil works projects aimed at totally restructuring a region's natural environment, and the birth of the environmental era.

== See also ==
- Atlantropa
- Salt Water Barrier (Delaware River)
