= Yerba Buena Tunnel =

Highway tunnel in San Francisco, California

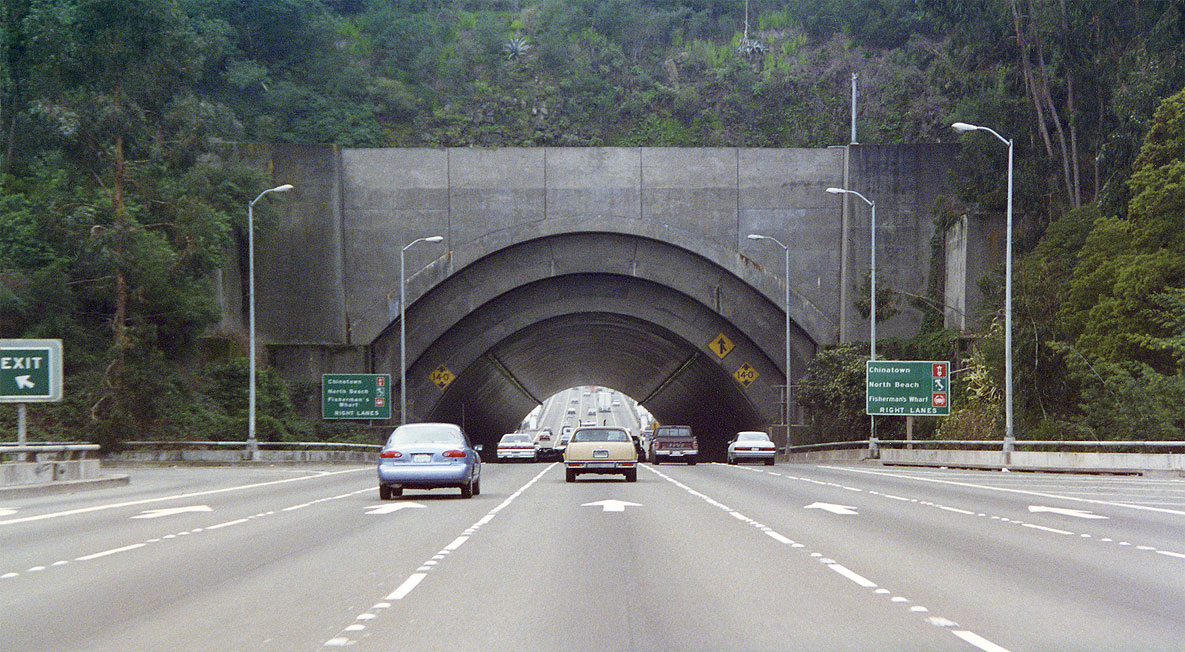
- Eastern portal of the Yerba Buena Tunnel, upper deck. Pictured in December 1994.

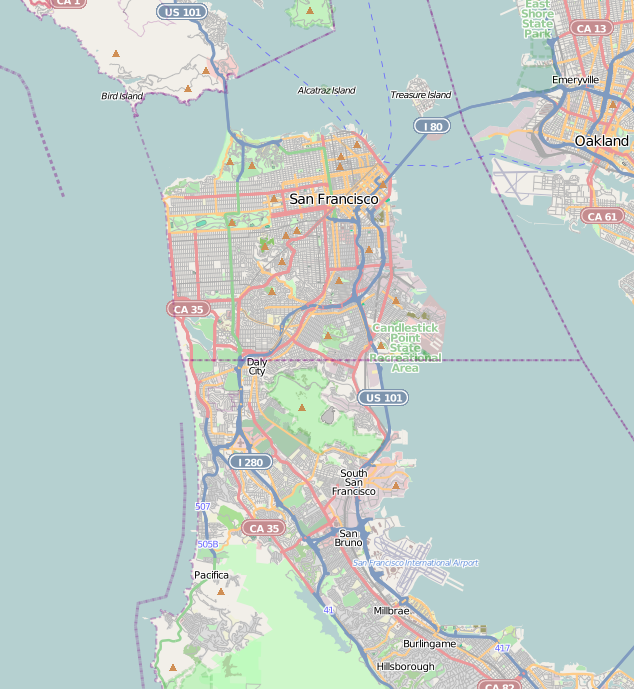
- Location within San Francisco County Location within San Francisco Location within San Francisco Bay Area

Overview
- Other name: Yerba Buena Island Tunnel
- Location: San Francisco, California
- Coordinates: 37°48′34″N 122°21′56″W
- Route: I-80
- Crosses: Yerba Buena Island

Operation
- Work began: July 9, 1933
- Constructed: 1933–36
- Opened: November 12, 1936
- Rebuilt: 1961–62
- Owner: Caltrans (District 4)
- Traffic: automotive
- Vehicles per day: 250,000 (2014)

Technical
- Design engineer: Charles H. Purcell
- Length: 540 ft (160 m)
- No. of lanes: 10
- Tunnel clearance: 58 ft (18 m)
- Width: 76 ft (23 m)

The Yerba Buena Tunnel, also known as the Yerba Buena Island Tunnel, is a highway tunnel in San Francisco, California. It is the part of San Francisco–Oakland Bay Bridge complex that crosses Yerba Buena Island. The Yerba Buena Tunnel carries ten lanes of Interstate 80 (I-80) on two decks, connecting the two component spans of the Bay Bridge, the western suspension span and the eastern self-anchored suspension span. At the opening of the Bay Bridge in 1936, it was the world's largest-bore tunnel.

== History ==
Preliminary surveys to lay out the route of the planned Bay Bridge were held in April 1931. Dedication ceremonies were held on February 24, 1932, and by April 1932, the final design for the Bay Bridge, including the single-bore tunnel through Yerba Buena Island, had been completed and submitted for approval. The contract to build the Yerba Buena Cable Anchorage, Tunnel & Viaduct segment was opened for bids on March 28, 1933, and awarded to the low bidder, Clinton Construction Company of California, for $1,821,129.50 (equivalent to $35.9 million in 2025). Yerba Buena Island was the main site of the official groundbreaking for the Bay Bridge on July 9, 1933, when President Franklin D. Roosevelt remotely set off a dynamite blast on the eastern side of the island at 12:58 p.m. local time. Former President Herbert Hoover and Governor James Rolph were onsite; the two men were the first to turn over the earth with ceremonial golden spades. Other ceremonies took place simultaneously in San Francisco (on Rincon Hill) and Oakland Harbor.

The Yerba Buena Tunnel opened, along with the rest of the Bay Bridge, on November 12, 1936. The tunnel lacks an official name.

=== Holiday wreath tradition ===
A holiday wreath was first installed above the tunnel's westbound portal in December of 1937. The installation inspired an annual tradition in 2011 when permanent anchors were installed in the top middle of the tunnel arch. The artificial wreath measures 13 feet (4 m) in diameter, weighs 300 lb (136 kg), and is visible to west-bound traffic approaching from Oakland.

Beginning in 2026, the wreath and a special ornament were dedicated to the memory of Peter Lee, an engineer who worked for the Metropolitan Transportation Commission for 28 years before his death in November 2025. The wreath is installed each November and removed after the New Year by the Bay Area Toll Authority and CalTrans.

=== Corrosion ===
On January 30, 2016, a chunk of concrete the size of an automobile tire fell from the tunnel wall into the slow lane of eastbound traffic on the lower deck of the Yerba Buena Tunnel, causing a minor accident. The concrete fell from where the upper deck is connected to the tunnel wall. Based on an examination of photographs, a professor from Georgia Tech postulated that water infiltration into the concrete wall had caused the reinforcing steel to corrode and expand, forcing a chunk of the tunnel wall out. A subsequent California Department of Transportation (Caltrans) investigation identified 12 spots on both sides of the tunnel wall in the lower deck space showed signs of corrosion-induced damage, but no immediate risk of further spalling. The apparent cause was rainwater leaking from upper deck drains. Caltrans engineers speculated the Masonite pads had swelled due to rainwater infiltration, cracking the tunnel walls and allowing moisture in to the reinforcing steel.

Repairs to the degraded concrete started in February 2017. Drains and catch basins were replaced to reduce the likelihood of clogging, and fiberglass-reinforced mortar was used to patch removed concrete. The repairs, which required some daytime lane closures, were expected to last until June 2017.

== Design and construction ==
California Department of Transportation engineer C.H. Purcell served as chief engineer for the Bay Bridge, including the construction of the Yerba Buena Tunnel. Before starting excavation, the ground through which the western half of the tunnel would be bored was stabilized by injecting cement grout under pressure through 25 1.5-inch (38 mm) holes bored into the loose rock over the crown of the tunnel.

After excavating the western and eastern open portals, three drifts were bored from west to east along the path of the tunnel: one at the crown and the other two at the lower corners. The first drift broke through in July 1934, approximately one year after the start of construction. A ceremonial party led by Governor Merriam celebrated the completion of the first 12-foot-square (3.7 m) drift on July 24 by walking through it, followed by a short speech. The space between the three drifts was then excavated, resulting in a single arch-shaped bore (in cross-section), and the tunnel roof was constructed using 16-inch (410 mm) steel I-beam ribs spaced 3 feet (0.91 m) apart to support the rock, which were then embedded in concrete up to 3 feet (0.91 m) thick at the crown. No cave-ins occurred during the excavation of the tunnel.

After the roof was completed, the remaining core of rock between the tunnel roof and lower deck was excavated using a power shovel. By May 1935, work on removing the core was progressing and 40 steel ribs had been placed; concrete embedment was just starting. Removal of the core was completed on November 18, 1935. Once the excavation was complete, the upper deck was placed and the interior ceiling above the upper deck was lined with tiles. The last concrete poured during the construction of the Bay Bridge was part of the upper deck lining in late summer 1936. This included the emplacement of regularly spaced refuge bays ("deadman holes") along the south wall of the lower deck tunnel, escape alcoves common in all railway tunnels into which track maintenance workers could duck if a train came along. These remain and are visible to eastbound motorists today.

The completed tunnel bore is 76 feet (23 m) wide and 58 feet (18 m) high overall, and the dimensions of the tunnel interior are 66 feet (20 m) wide and 53 feet (16 m) high. In 1936, it was hailed as the world's largest-bore tunnel. The cross-sectional area of the upper half is 1,500 square feet (140 m^{2}), and the lower half is 1,000 square feet (93 m^{2}).

=== Decks and The Hump ===
Yerba Buena Tunnel cross-sections (facing east)

1938

1962

Redrawn from HAER drawings by Zachary Goodman

The tunnel has two decks. As originally completed, the upper deck was reserved for automobile traffic, and carried six lanes, each 9 feet 8 inches (2.95 m) wide. The lower deck was further divided into three lanes of traffic for heavy trucks (each 10 feet 4 inches [3.15 m] wide), and two railroad tracks on the south side (27 feet [8.2 m] wide for both tracks). The initial design in 1932 called for the two rail tracks to flank a central truck deck on the lower level. After Key System trains stopped running over the bridge in 1958, bids were opened on October 11, 1960, to rebuild the tunnel. The rebuild consisted of multiple stages of work:

1. Remove Key System rails, lower rail deck and repave
2. Lower the truck traffic half of the lower deck by 3 feet (0.91 m) and repave
3. Remove center columns supporting upper deck
4. Lower the upper deck by 16 inches (410 mm) by placing precast concrete units

After the reconstruction, the tunnel would handle only road traffic. The upper deck was lowered to accommodate heavy truck traffic, as each deck would now carry five lanes of unidirectional traffic. The upper deck was dedicated to westbound traffic, and the lower deck was dedicated to eastbound traffic. The impact to traffic during reconstruction of the tunnel was minimized mainly by working outside normal commuting hours and through the use of a portable steel bridge 26 feet (7.9 m) long and 58 feet (18 m) wide, designed to fit between the curbs of the existing upper deck. The bridge spanned the gap between the new upper deck and old upper deck, and the overall elevation change of 26 inches (660 mm) caused drivers to slow to 15 miles per hour (24 km/h), resulting in traffic jams. The first accident caused by "The Hump", the nickname the bridge acquired after prominent warning signs advertising its presence, occurred just twelve minutes after it was first deployed on November 25, 1961.

The new precast upper deck units were each 7 feet 8 inches (2.34 m) long, and were installed in two halves. One side of each half rested on a temporary falsework erected in the middle of the lower deck, and the other side rested on the shoulder of the tunnel wall previously used to support the old upper deck. After the two halves were fastened together, a steel form was used to close the 1-foot-6-inch-wide (0.46 m) gap between halves, and concrete was poured in the gap. The upper deck rests on 12-inch-wide (30 cm) shoulders built into the tunnel wall, padded by 1/2-inch-thick (1.3 cm) Masonite.

The planned completion date for tunnel reconstruction was July 1962, but "The Hump" was not dismantled until October 27, 1962. The San Francisco Chronicle marked the occasion by quipping "[The Hump] produced more jams than Grandma ever made." After reconstruction, both the upper and lower decks featured 16 feet (4.9 m) of vertical clearance. Upper deck clearance is restricted by the tunnel portal, and lower deck clearance is restricted by the upper deck.

== "Emperor Norton Tunnel" naming proposal ==
Yerba Buena Tunnel is not officially named. In August 2025, The Emperor Norton Trust — a nonprofit that since 2013 has been engaged in research, education, and advocacy to advance the legacy of Joshua Abraham Norton — introduced a proposal that the California state legislature name the tunnel "Emperor Norton Tunnel" in 2026, the 90th anniversary of the Bay Bridge and the 180th anniversary of Norton's original arrival in the United States in 1846.

In 1872, Emperor Norton issued three newspaper proclamations setting out his vision for a bridge that linked Oakland and San Francisco via Yerba Buena Island.

== Gallery ==
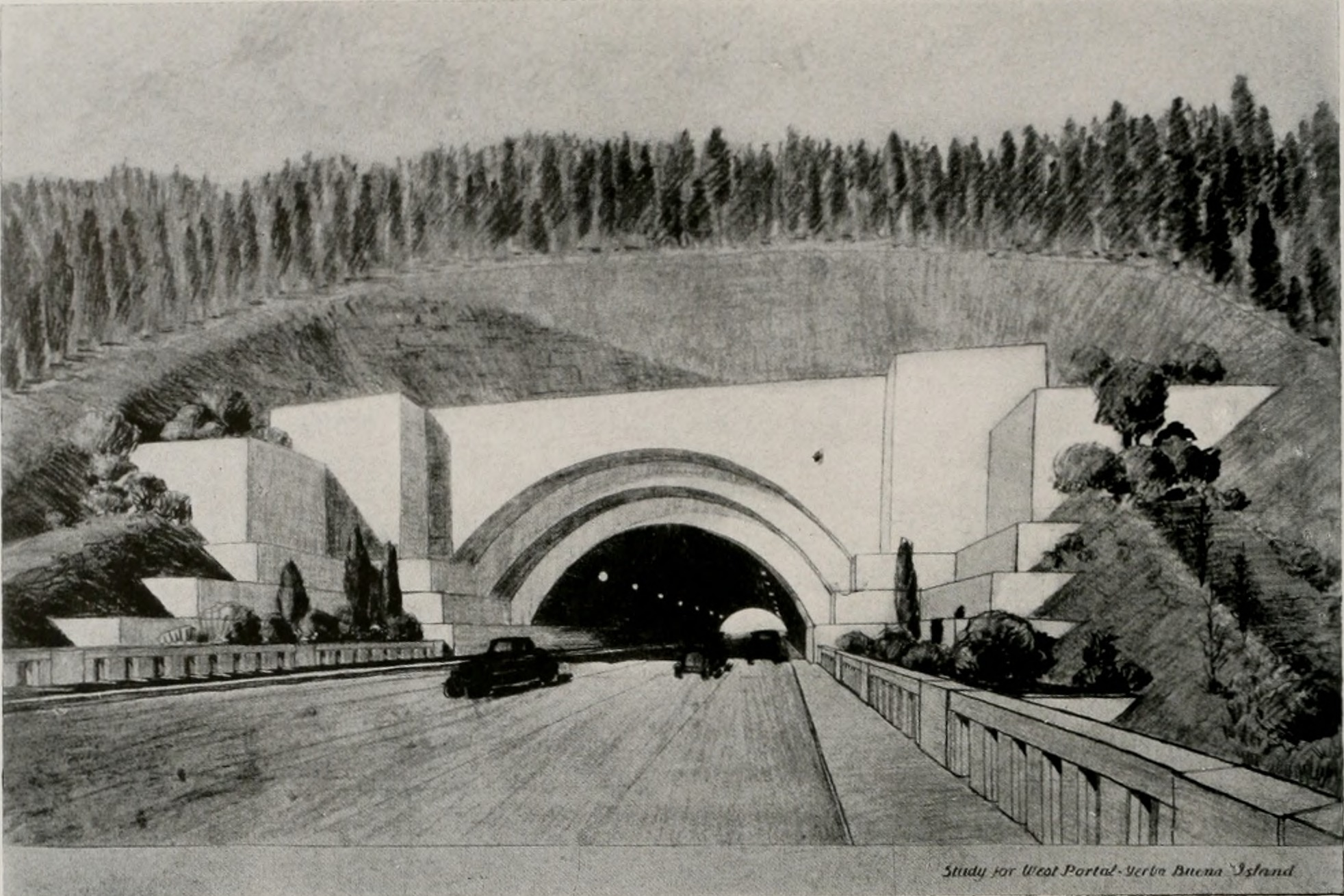
Study of western portal of Yerba Buena Tunnel (1933)

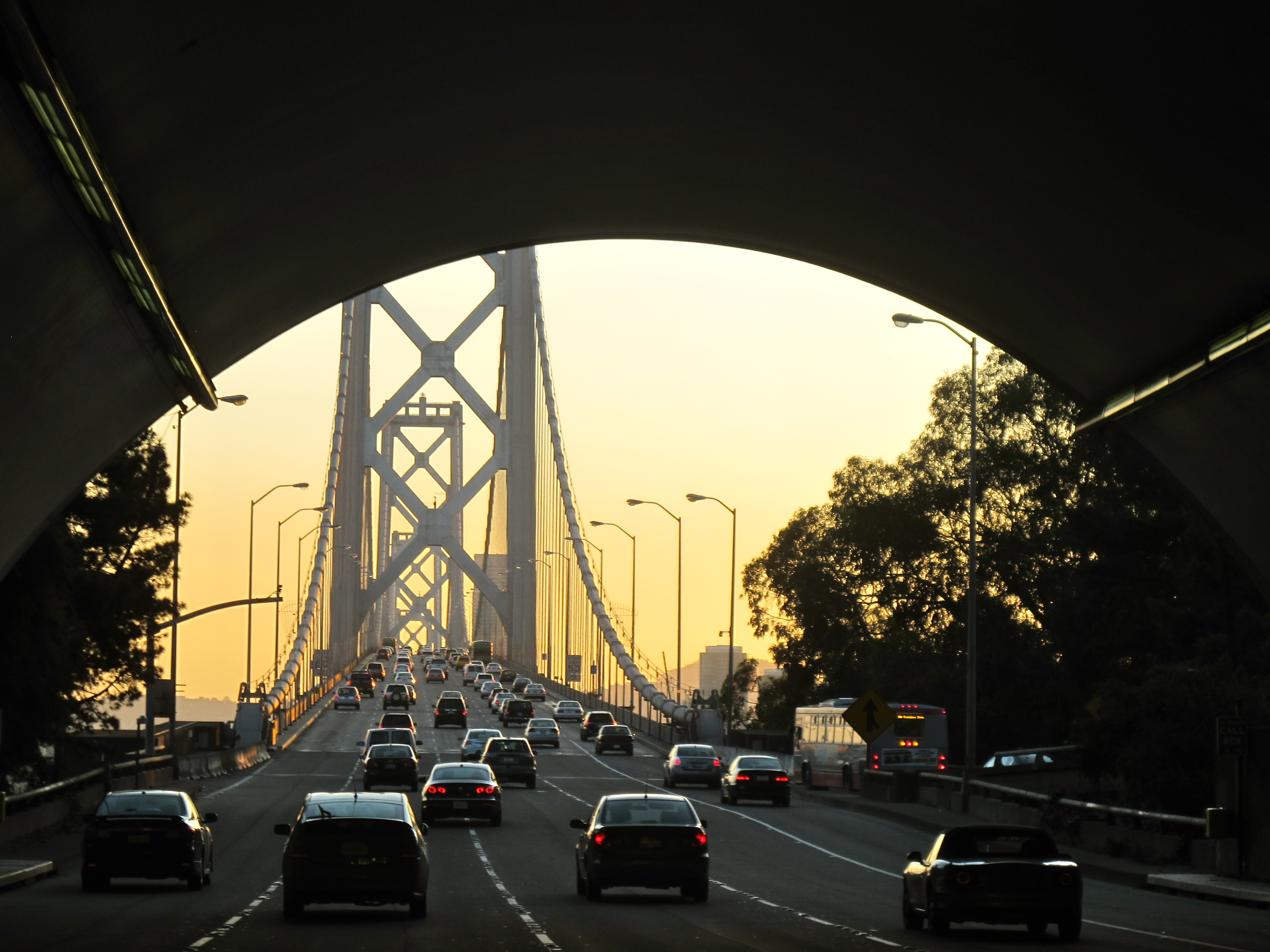
Exiting western portal of Yerba Buena Tunnel (2011)

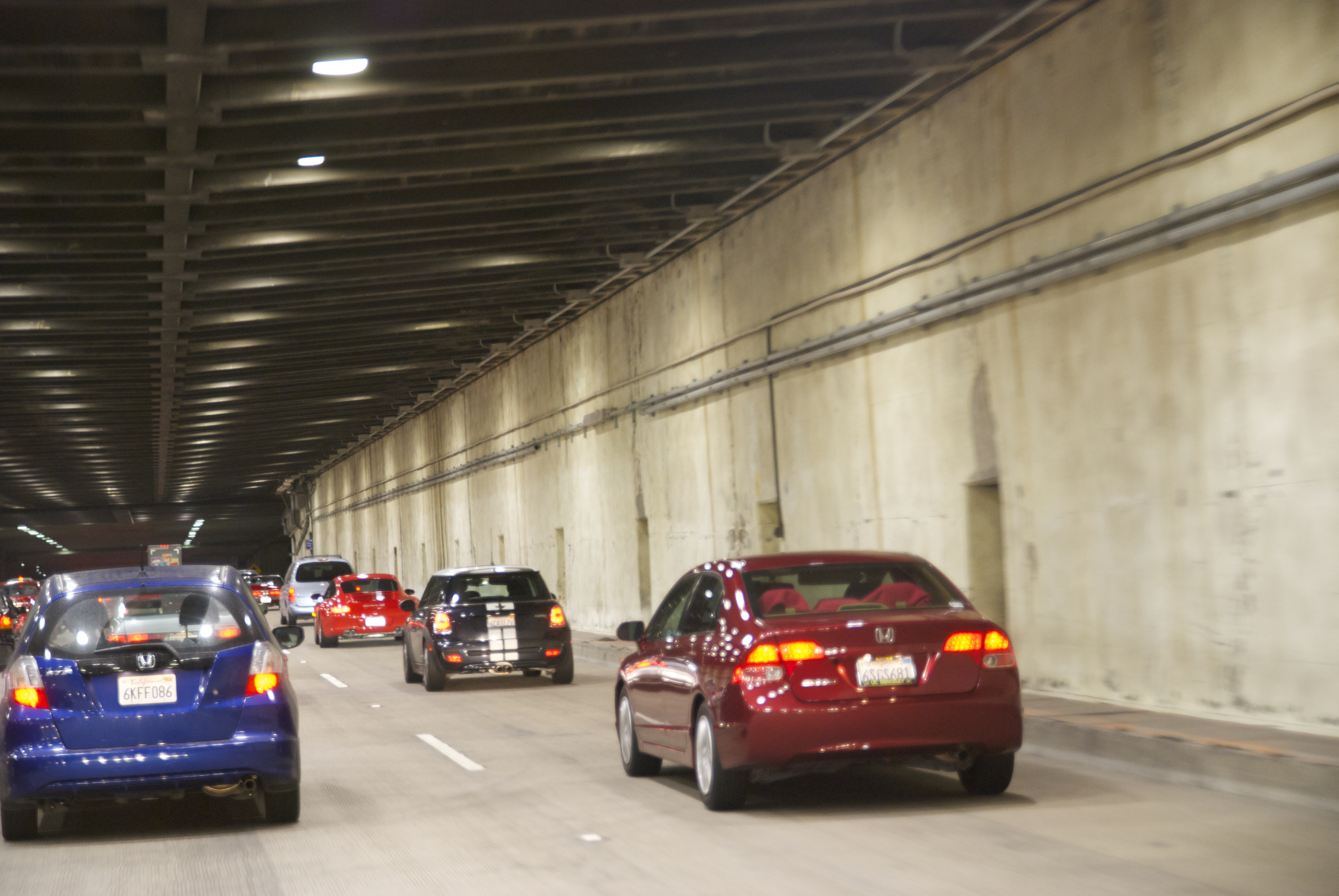
Lower deck of Yerba Buena Tunnel showing "deadman" holes on south side (2013)

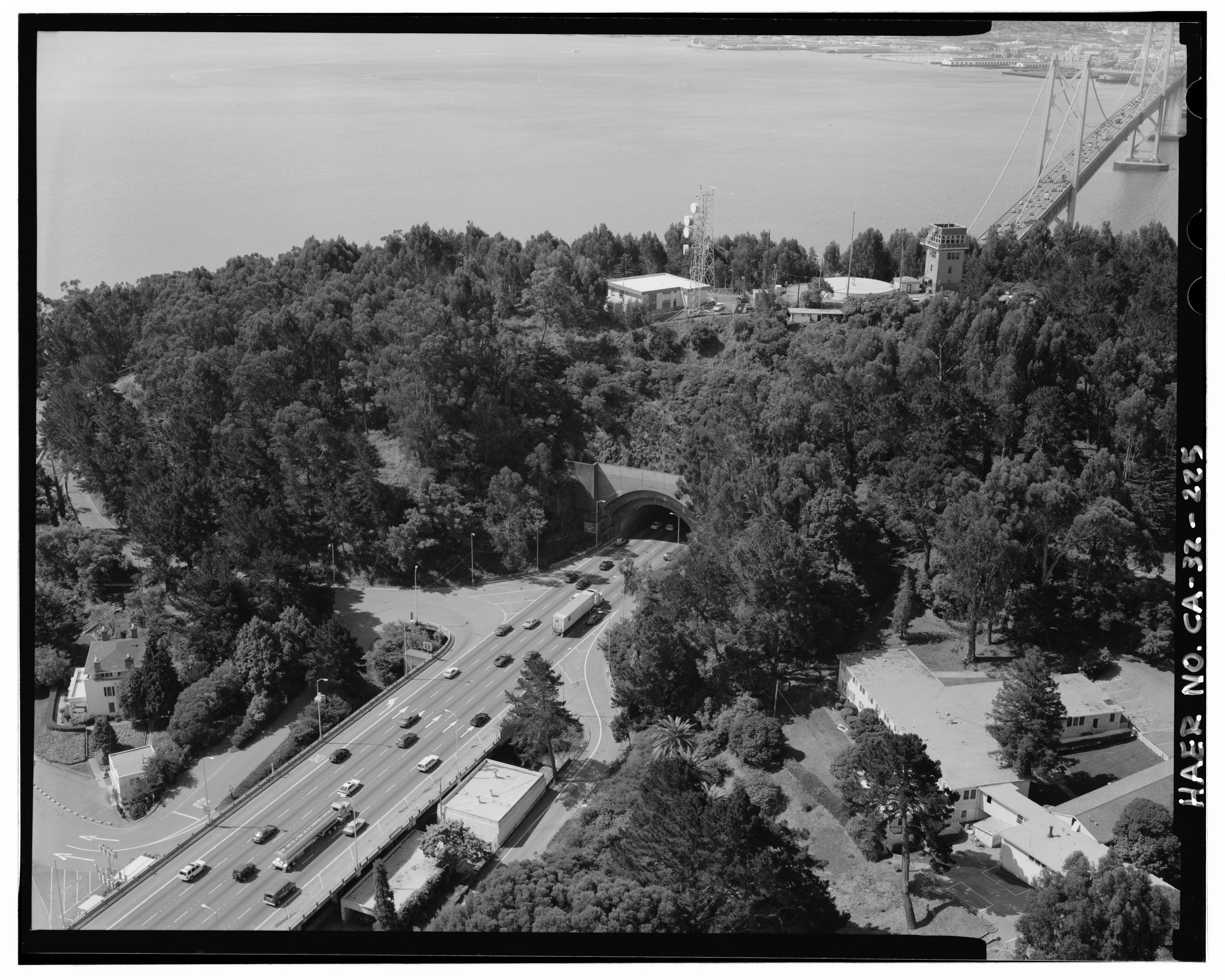
Westbound traffic approaches Yerba Buena Tunnel (1998)

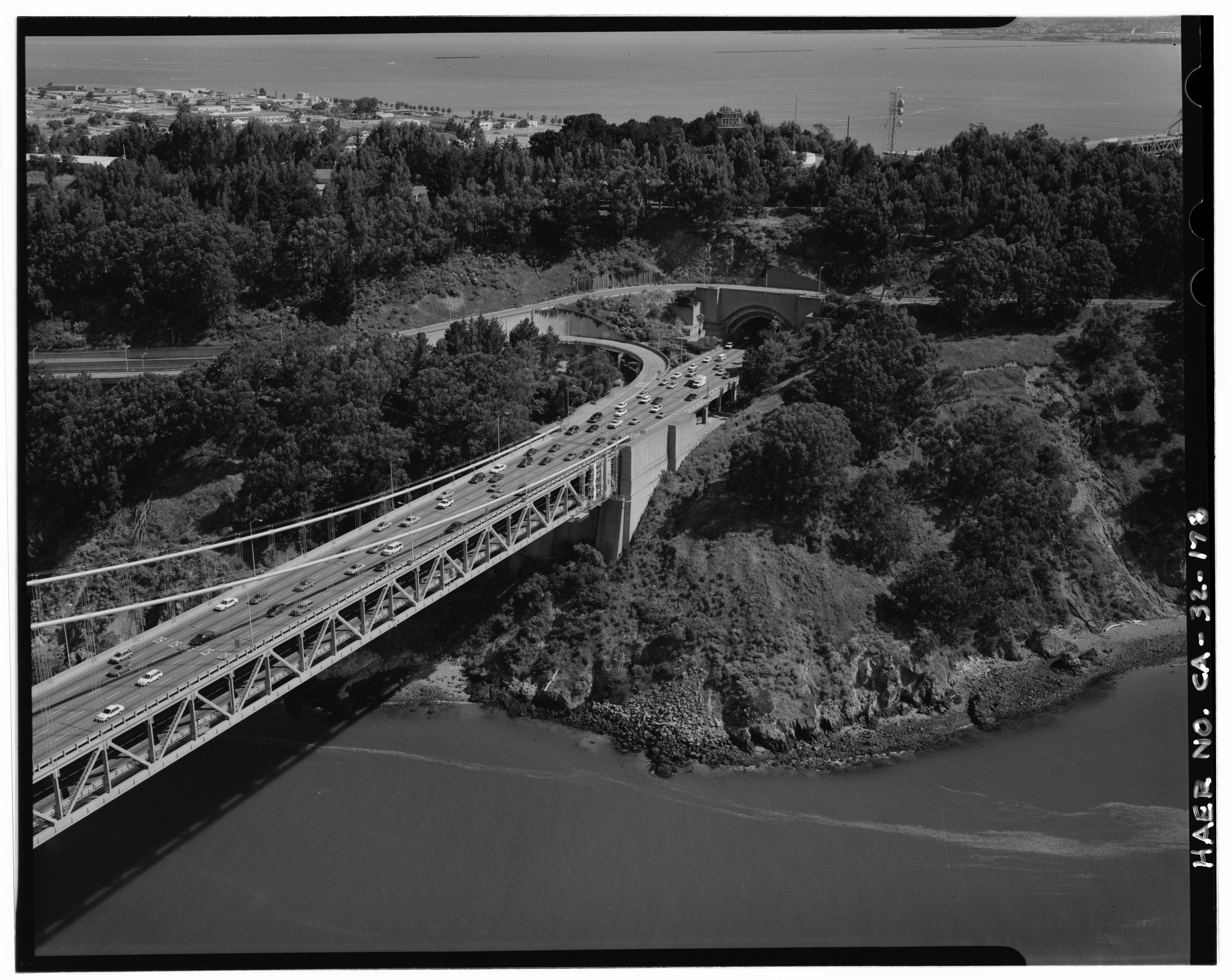
Westbound traffic exits western portal of Yerba Buena Tunnel (1998)

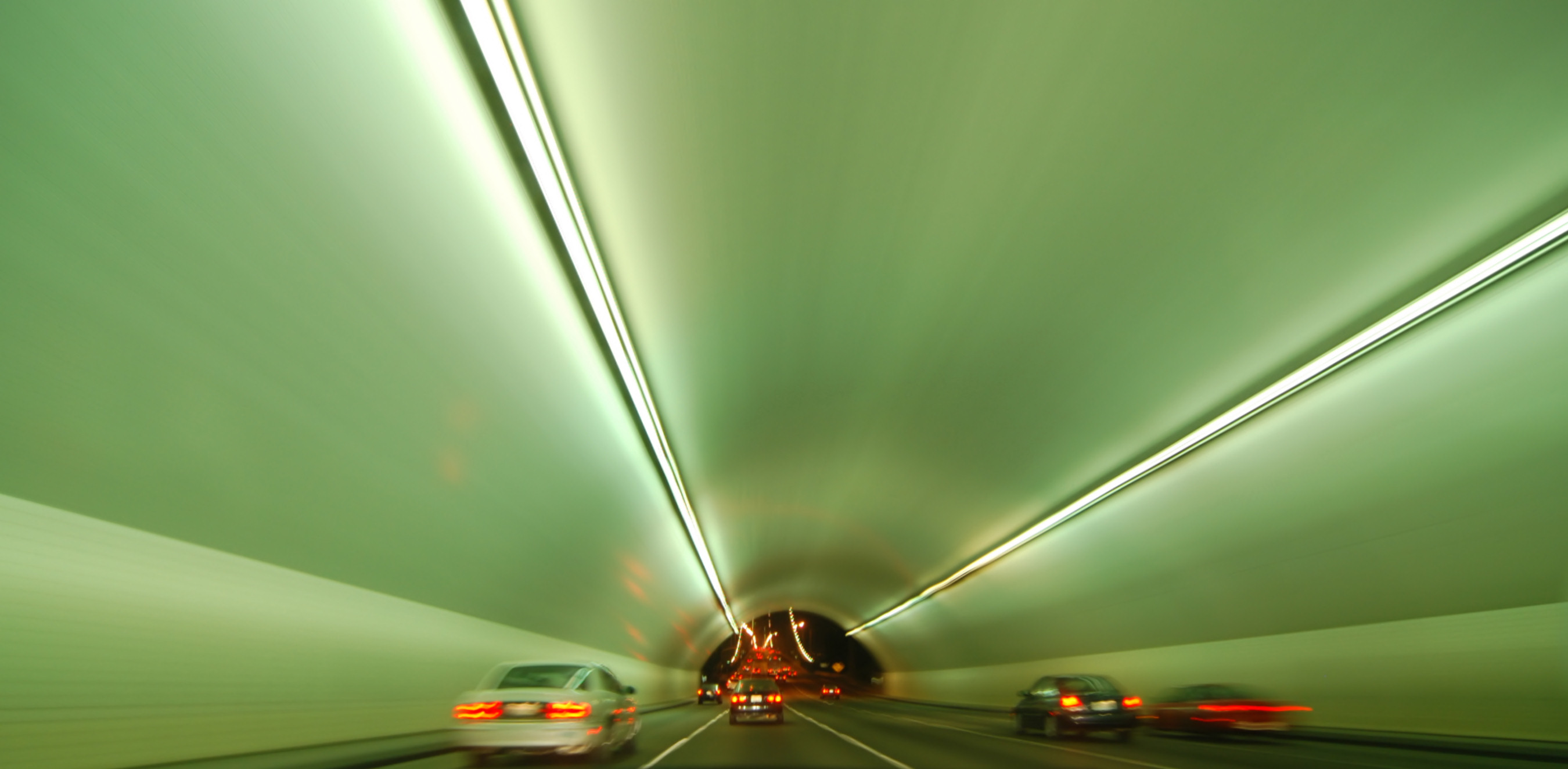
Westbound traffic in Yerba Buena Tunnel (2006)

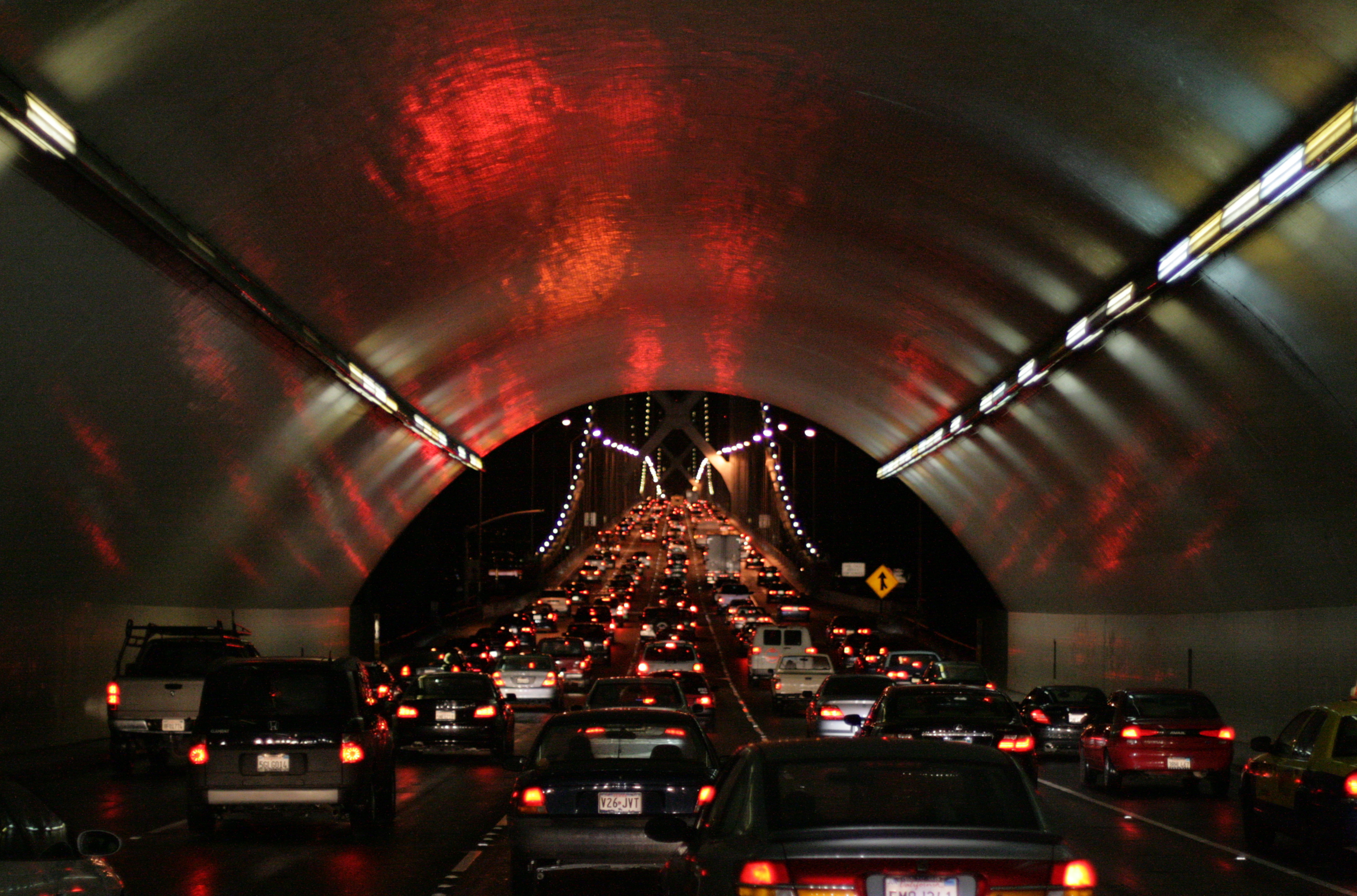
Yerba Buena Tunnel, westbound night traffic (2008)
