= Ship channel =

A ship channel can be an artificial or dredged navigable channel for ships; see Fairway (navigation). A ship channel can also be a channel formed through surface ice by a ship.

Several waterways are referred to as the Ship Channel

- Calcasieu Ship Channel
- Corpus Christi Ship Channel
- Houston Ship Channel
- Matagorda Ship Channel
- Sacramento Deep Water Ship Channel

== See also ==
- Sethusamudram Shipping Canal Project
- Stockton Deepwater Shipping Channel
