= Rainbow Tunnel =

Rainbow tunnel may refer to:

- The Robin Williams Tunnel in Sausalito, California
- The Light Tunnel in the McNamara Terminal at the Detroit Metro Airport
