= San Francisco–Oakland Bay Bridge =

Complex of two bridges spanning San Francisco Bay

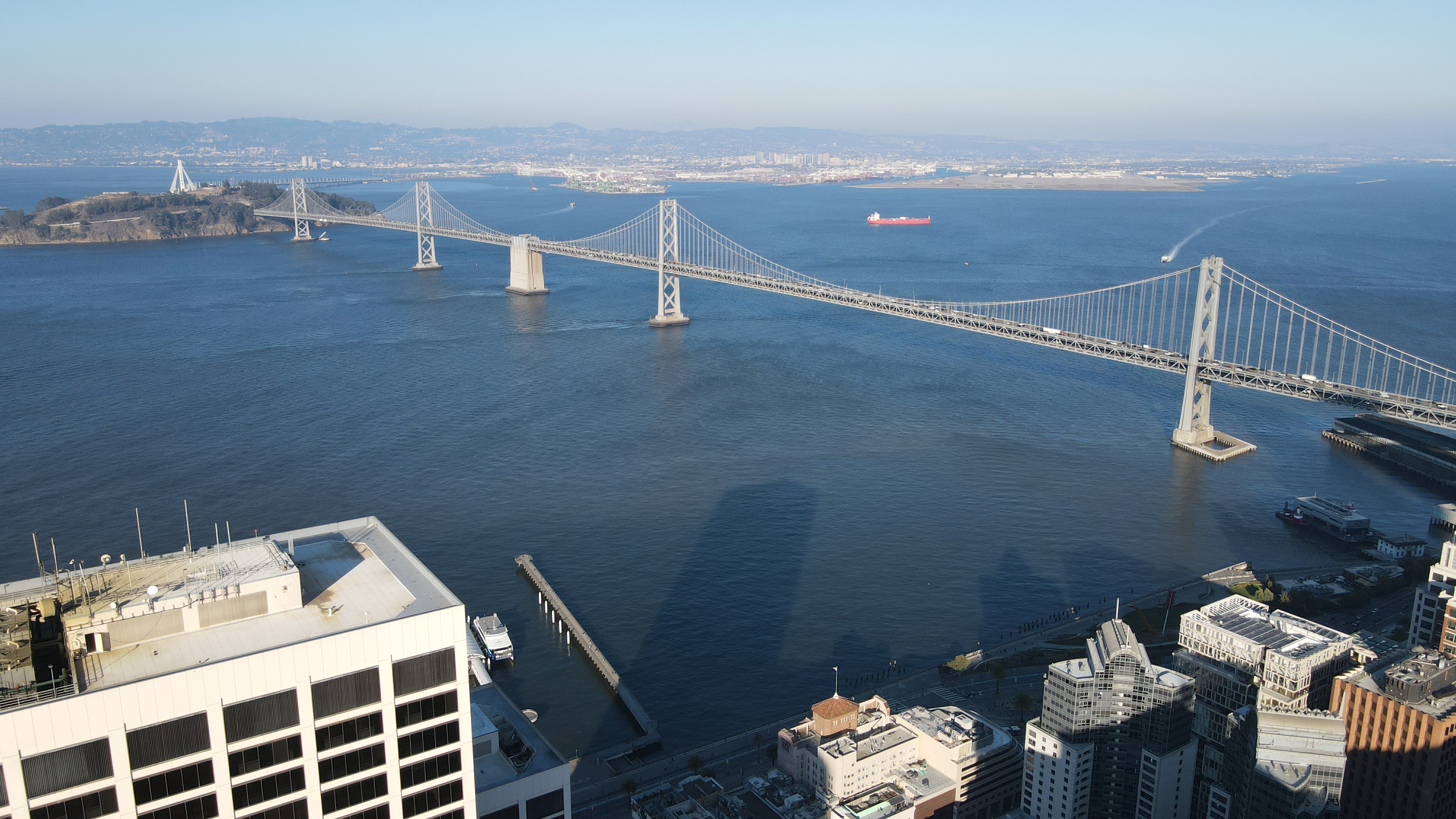
- The Western section of the Bay Bridge, seen in 2022. Part of the eastern section can be seen beyond Yerba Buena Island to the left.
- Coordinates: 37°49′5″N 122°20′48″W
- Carries: 10 lanes of I-80; Bicycles and pedestrians east of Yerba Buena Island (YBI) (since 2013); Railway tracks for Key System interurbans (until 1958)
- Crosses: San Francisco Bay via YBI
- Locale: San Francisco and Oakland, California, U.S.
- Owner: State of California
- Maintained by: California Department of Transportation and the Bay Area Toll Authority
- ID number: 34 0003 (West); 34 0004 (YBI Tunnel); 33 0025 (East)

Characteristics
- Design: Double-decked suspension spans (two, connected by center anchorage), tunnel, cast-in-place concrete transition span, self-anchored suspension span, precast segmental concrete viaduct
- Material: Steel, concrete
- Total length: West: 10,304 ft (3,141 m); East span: 10,176 ft (3,102 m); Total: 4.46 miles (7.18 km) excluding approaches
- Width: West: 5 traffic lanes totaling 57.5 ft (17.5 m); East: 10 traffic lanes totaling 258.33 ft (78.74 m)
- Height: West: 526 ft (160 m); East: 525 ft (160 m) (SAS)
- Longest span: West: two main spans 2,310 ft (704 m); East: one main span 1,400 ft (430 m)
- Clearance above: Westbound: 14 feet (4.3 m), with additional clearance in some lanes Eastbound: 14.67 feet (4.47 m)
- Clearance below: West: 220 feet (67 m); East: 190 feet (58 m)

History
- Designer: Charles H. Purcell
- Construction start: July 9, 1933 (original eastern and western spans); January 29, 2002 (replacement eastern span)
- Construction end: November 12, 1936 (original eastern and western spans); September 2, 2013 (replacement eastern span)
- Opened: November 12, 1936; 90 years ago September 2, 2013; 13 years ago
- Closed: August 28, 2013 (original eastern span)

Statistics
- Daily traffic: 260,000
- Toll: East span, westbound only; FasTrak or pay-by-plate, cash not accepted; Effective January 1 – December 31, 2026: $8.50; $4.25 (carpools during weekday peak hours, FasTrak only)

U.S. National Register of Historic Places
- Designated: August 13, 2001
- Reference no.: 00000525

Location
- Interactive map of San Francisco–Oakland; Bay Bridge

The San Francisco–Oakland Bay Bridge, commonly referred to as the Bay Bridge, is a complex of two bridges and a tunnel spanning San Francisco Bay in California. As part of Interstate 80 and the direct road between San Francisco and Oakland, it carries about 260,000 vehicles a day on its two decks. It includes one of the longest bridge spans in the United States.

The toll bridge was conceived as early as the California gold rush days, with "Emperor" Joshua Norton famously advocating for it with three newspaper proclamations in 1872, but construction did not begin until 1933. Designed by Charles H. Purcell, and built by American Bridge Company, with construction directed by the chairman of the engineering committee Edward Hansen Connor, it opened on Thursday, November 12, 1936, six months before the Golden Gate Bridge. It originally carried automobile traffic on its upper deck, with trucks, cars, buses and commuter trains on the lower, but after the Key System abandoned its rail service on April 20, 1958, the lower deck was converted to all-road traffic as well. On October 12, 1963, traffic was reconfigured to one-way traffic on each deck, westbound on the upper deck, and eastbound on the lower deck, with trucks and buses also allowed on the upper deck. In 1986, the bridge was unofficially dedicated to former California governor James Rolph.

The bridge has two sections of roughly equal length; the older western section, officially known as the Willie L. Brown Jr. Bridge (after former San Francisco mayor and California State Assembly speaker Willie L. Brown Jr.), connects downtown San Francisco to Yerba Buena Island, and the newer east bay section connects the island to Oakland. The two sections are connected by Yerba Buena Tunnel through the island's central hill. The western section is a double suspension bridge with two decks, westbound traffic being carried on the upper deck while eastbound is carried on the lower one. The largest span of the original eastern section was a cantilever bridge.

During the 1989 Loma Prieta earthquake, a portion of the eastern section's upper deck collapsed onto the lower deck and the bridge was closed for a month. Reconstruction of the eastern section of the bridge as a causeway connected to a self-anchored suspension bridge began in 2002; the new eastern section opened September 2, 2013, at a reported cost of over $6.5 billion; the original estimate of $250 million was for a seismic retrofit of the existing span. Unlike the western section and the original eastern section of the bridge, the new eastern section is a single deck carrying all eastbound and westbound lanes. Demolition of the old east span was completed on September 8, 2018.

== Description ==
Bridges crossing San Francisco Bay

The bridge consists of two crossings, east and west of Yerba Buena Island, a natural mid-bay outcropping inside San Francisco city limits. The western crossing between Yerba Buena and downtown San Francisco has two complete suspension spans connected at a center anchorage. Rincon Hill is the western anchorage and touch-down for the San Francisco landing of the bridge connected by three shorter truss spans. The eastern crossing, between Yerba Buena Island and Oakland, was a cantilever bridge with a double-tower span, five medium truss spans, and a 14-section truss causeway. Due to earthquake concerns, the eastern crossing was replaced by a new crossing that opened on Labor Day 2013. On Yerba Buena Island, the double-decked crossing is a 321-foot (98 m) concrete viaduct east of the west span's cable anchorage, the 540-foot (160 m) Yerba Buena Tunnel through the island's rocky central hill, another 790.8-foot (241.0 m) concrete viaduct, and a longer curved high-level steel truss viaduct that spans the final 1,169.7 feet (356.5 m) to the cantilever bridge.

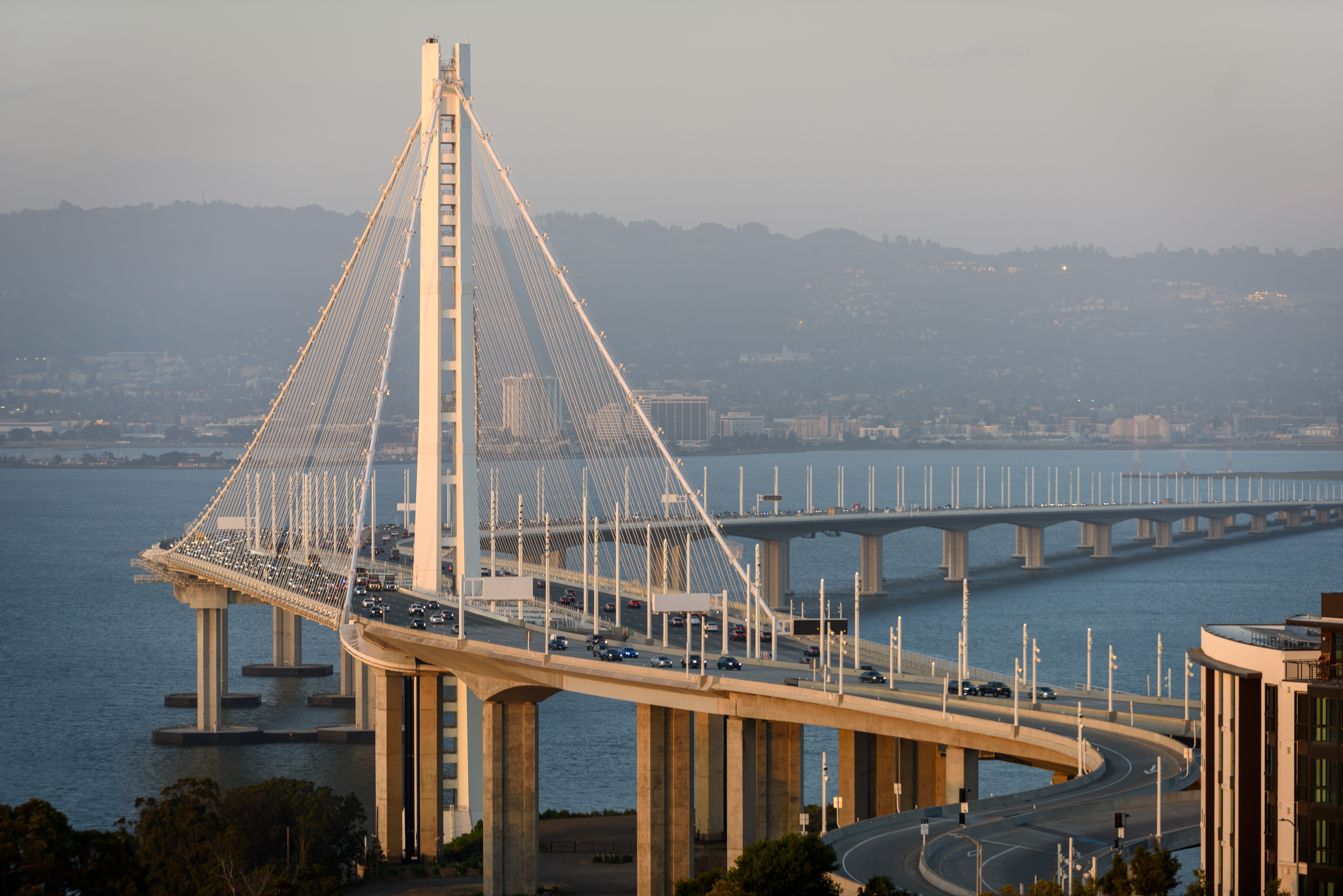
The eastern span of the bridge, as viewed from Yerba Buena Island, photographed in 2025.

The toll plaza on the Oakland side (westbound traffic only since 1969) has eighteen toll lanes, with all charges now made either through the FasTrak electronic toll collection system or through invoices mailed through the USPS, based on the license plate of the car per Department of Motor Vehicle records. Metering signals are about 1,000 feet (300 m) west of the toll plaza. Two full-time bus-only lanes bypass the toll booths and metering lights around the right (north) side of the toll plaza; other high occupancy vehicles can use these lanes during weekday morning and afternoon commute periods. The two far-left toll lanes are high-occupancy vehicle lanes during weekday commute periods. Radio and television traffic reports will often refer to congestion at the toll plaza, metering lights, or a parking lot in the median of the road for bridge employees; the parking lot is about 1,900 feet (580 m) long, stretching from about 800 feet (240 m) east of the toll plaza to about 100 feet (30 m) west of the metering lights.

During the morning commute hours, traffic congestion on the westbound approach from Oakland stretches back through the MacArthur Maze interchange at the east end of the bridge onto the three feeder highways, Interstate 580, Interstate 880, and I-80 toward Richmond. Since the number of lanes on the eastbound approach from San Francisco is structurally restricted, eastbound backups are also frequent during evening commute hours. The eastbound bottleneck is not the bridge itself, but the approach, which has just three lanes in each direction, in contrast to the bridge's five.

The western section of the Bay Bridge is currently restricted to motorized freeway traffic. Pedestrians, bicycles, and other non-freeway vehicles are not allowed to cross this section. A project to add bicycle/pedestrian lanes to the western section has been proposed but is not finalized. A Caltrans bicycle shuttle operates between Oakland and San Francisco during peak commute hours for $1.00 each way.

Freeway ramps next to the tunnel provide access to Yerba Buena Island and Treasure Island. Because the toll plaza is on the Oakland side, the western span is a de facto non-tolled bridge; traffic between the island and the main part of San Francisco can freely cross back and forth. Those who only travel from Oakland to Yerba Buena Island, and not the entire length to the main part of San Francisco, still must pay the full toll.

== Early history ==
Developed at the entrance to the bay, San Francisco was well placed to prosper during the California Gold Rush. Almost all goods not produced locally arrived by ship, as did numerous travelers and erstwhile miners. But after the first transcontinental railroad was completed in May 1869, San Francisco was on the wrong side of the Bay, and separated from the new rail link.

Many San Franciscans feared that the city would lose its position as the regional center of trade. Businessmen had considered the concept of a bridge spanning the San Francisco Bay since the Gold Rush days. During the 1870s, several newspaper articles explored the idea. In early 1872, a "Bay Bridge Committee" was hard at work on plans to construct a railroad bridge. The April 1872 issue of the San Francisco Real Estate Circular reported on this committee:

The Bay Bridge Committee lately submitted its report to the Board of Supervisors, in which compromise with the Central Pacific was recommended; also the bridging of the bay at Ravenswood and the granting of railroad facilities at Mission Bay and on the water front. Wm. C. Ralston, ex-Mayor Selby and James Otis were on this committee. A daily newspaper attempts to account for the advice of these gentlemen to the city by hinting that they were afraid of the railroad company, and therefore made their recommendations to suit its interests.

The self-proclaimed Emperor Norton decreed three times in 1872 that a suspension bridge be constructed to connect Oakland with San Francisco. In the third of these decrees, in September 1872, Norton, frustrated that nothing had happened, proclaimed:

WHEREAS, we issued our decree ordering the citizens of San Francisco and Oakland to appropriate funds for the survey of a suspension bridge from Oakland Point via Goat Island; also for a tunnel; and to ascertain which is the best project; and whereas the said citizens have hitherto neglected to notice our said decree; and whereas we are determined our authority shall be fully respected; now, therefore, we do hereby command the arrest by the army of both the Boards of City Fathers if they persist in neglecting our decrees. Given under our royal hand and seal at San Francisco, this 17th day of September, 1872.

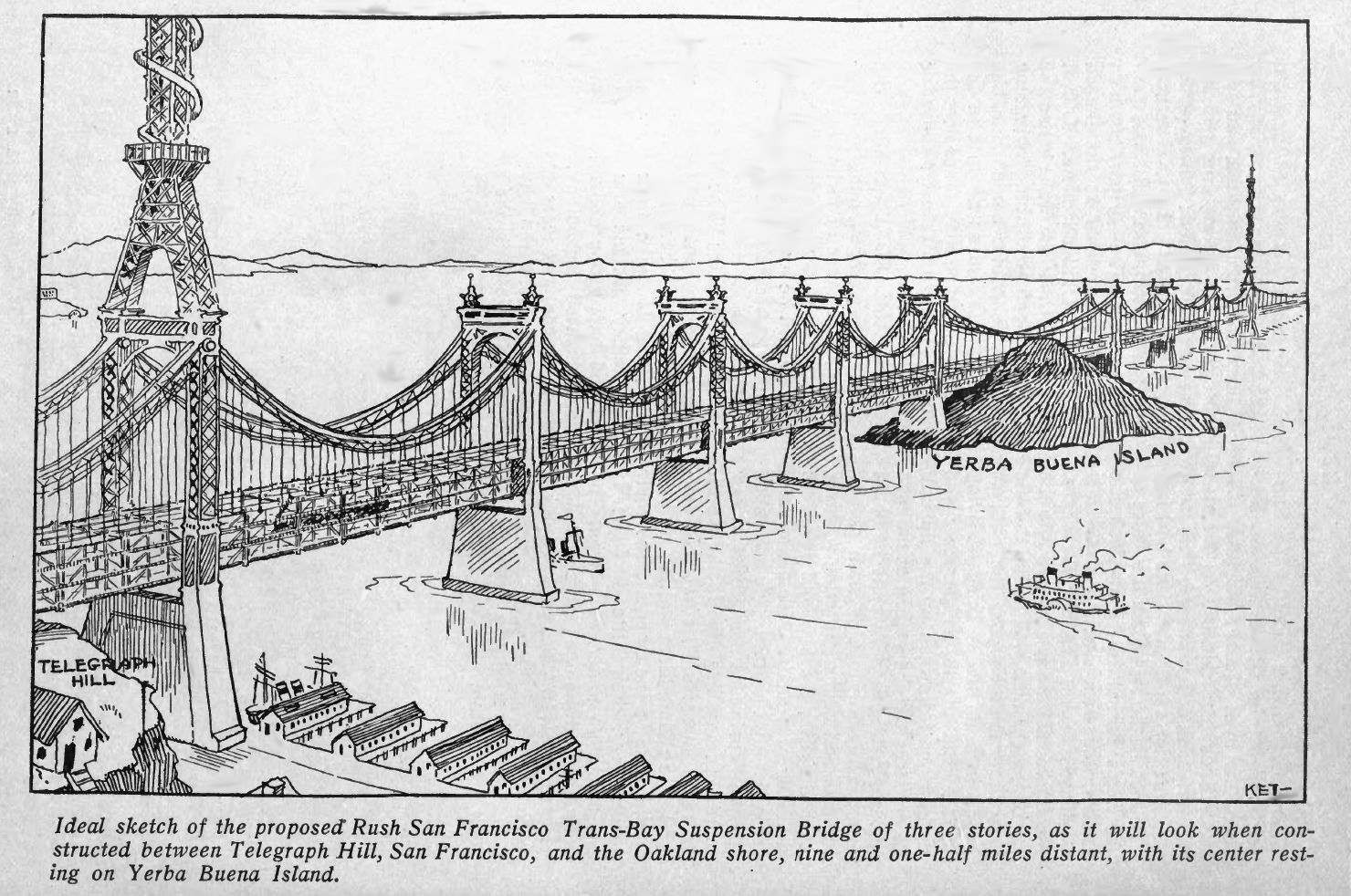
Sketch of the proposed "Rush San Francisco Trans-Bay Suspension Bridge" (1913)

Unlike most of Emperor Norton's eccentric ideas, his decree to build a bridge had a widespread public and political appeal. Yet the task was too much of an engineering and economic challenge, since the bay was too wide and too deep there. In 1921, more than forty years after Norton's death, an underground tube was considered, but it became clear that one would be inadequate for vehicular traffic. Support for a trans-bay crossing increased in the 1920s based on the popularity and availability of automobiles.

=== Planning ===
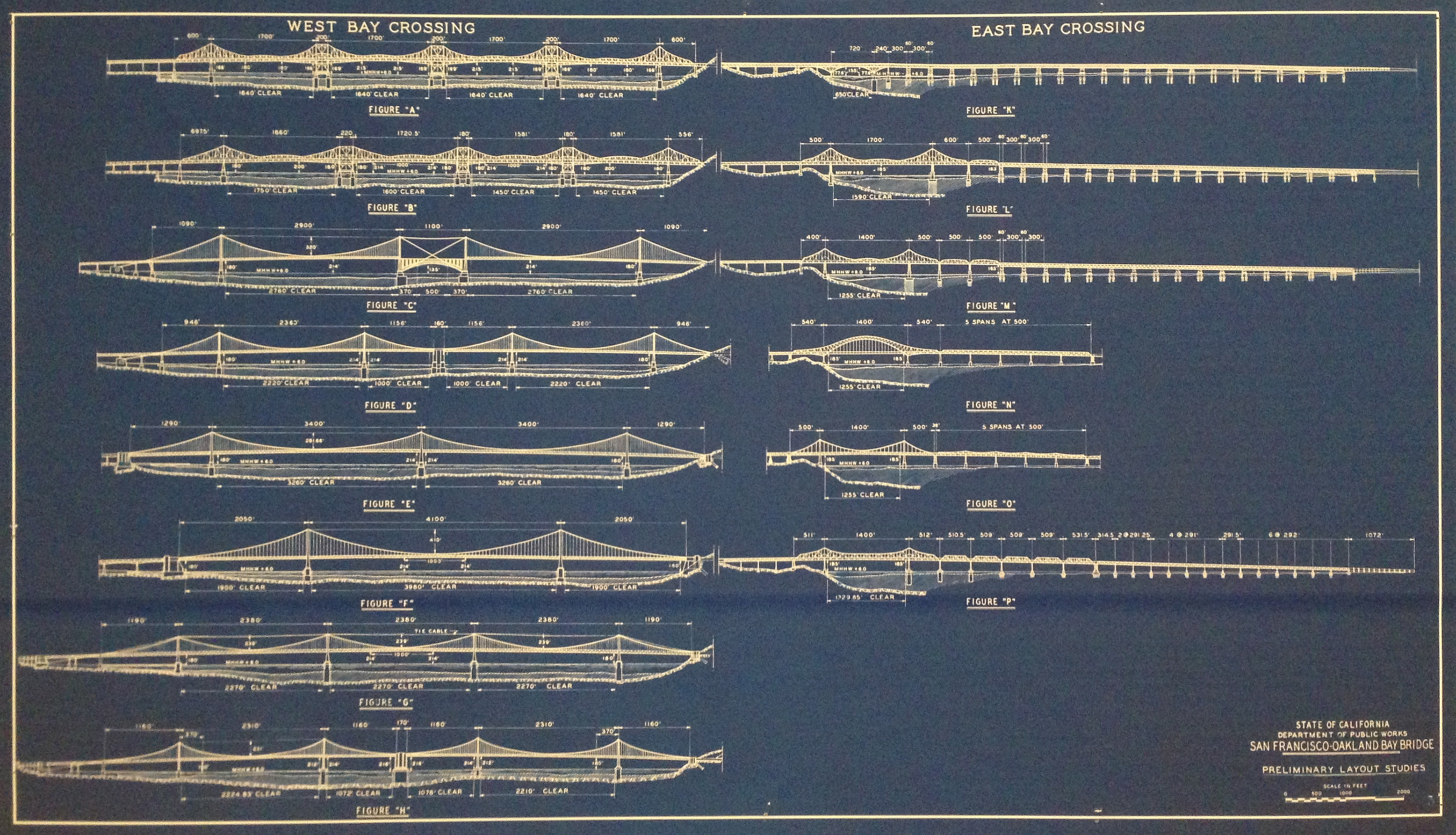
Preliminary layout studies for the bridge, with Figures "H", and "P" selected as the final construction choice for western and eastern sections

The California State Legislature and governor enacted a law, effective in 1929, to establish the California Toll Bridge Authority (Stats. 1929, Chap 763) and to authorize it and the State Department of Public Works to build a bridge connecting San Francisco and Alameda County (Stats. 1929, Chap 762).

The state appointed a commission to evaluate the idea and various designs for a bridge across the Bay, the Hoover-Young Commission. Its conclusions were made public in 1930.

In January 1931, Charles H. Purcell, the State Highway Engineer of California, who had also served as the secretary of the Hoover-Young Commission, assumed the position of Chief Engineer for the Bay Bridge. Glenn B. Woodruff served as design engineer for the project. He explained in a 1936 article that several elements of the bridge required not only new designs, but also new theories of design.

To make the bridge feasible, a route was chosen via Yerba Buena Island, which would reduce both the material and the labor needed. Since Yerba Buena Island was a U.S. Navy base at the time, the state had to gain approval from Congress for this purpose as it regulates and controls all federal lands and the armed services. After a great deal of lobbying, California received Congressional approval to use the island on February 20, 1931, subject to final approvals by the Departments of War, Navy, and Commerce. The state applied for permits from the three federal departments as required. The permits were granted in January 1932, and formally presented in a ceremony on Yerba Buena Island on February 24, 1932.

On May 25, 1931, Governor James Rolph Jr. signed into law two acts: one providing for the financing of state bridges by revenue bonds, and another creating the San Francisco–Oakland Bay Bridge Division of the State Department of Public Works. On September 15, 1931, this new division opened its offices at 500 Sansome Street in San Francisco.

During 1931, numerous aerial photographs were taken of the chosen route for the bridge and its approaches.

That year, engineers had not determined the final design concept for the western span between San Francisco and Yerba Buena Island, although the idea of a double-span suspension bridge was already favored.

In April 1932, the preliminary final plan and design of the bridge was presented by Chief Engineer Charles Purcell to Col. Walter E. Garrison, Director of the State Department of Public Works, and to Ralph Modjeski, head of the Board of Engineering Consultants. Both agencies approved and preparation of the final design proceeded. In 1932, Joseph R. Knowland, a former U.S. Congressman from California, traveled to Washington to help persuade President Herbert Hoover and the Reconstruction Finance Corporation to advance $62 million to build the bridge.

=== Construction ===
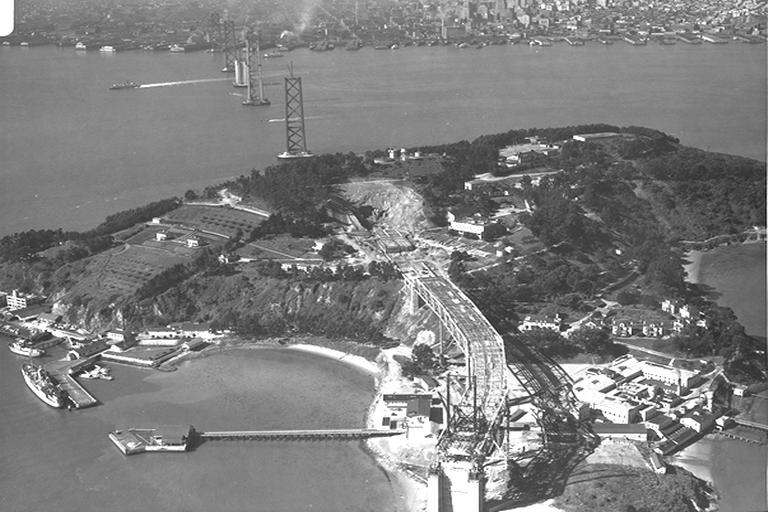
The Bay Bridge under construction at Yerba Buena Island in 1935

Before work began, 12 massive underwater telephone cables were moved 1,000 feet (300 m) of the proposed bridge route by crews of the Pacific Telephone and Telegraph Co. during the summer of 1931.

Construction began on July 9, 1933 after a groundbreaking ceremony attended by former president Herbert Hoover, dignitaries, and local beauty queens.

The western section of the bridge between San Francisco and Yerba Buena Island presented an enormous engineering challenge. The bay was up to 100 feet (30 m) deep in places and the soil required new foundation-laying techniques. A single main suspension span some 4,100 feet (1.2 km) in length was considered but rejected, as it would have required too much fill and reduced wharfage space at San Francisco, had less vertical clearance for shipping, and cost more than the design ultimately adopted. The solution was to construct a massive concrete anchorage halfway between San Francisco and the island, and to build a main suspension span on each side of this central anchorage.

East of Yerba Buena Island, the bay to Oakland was spanned by a 10,176-foot (3.102 km) combination of double cantilever, five long-span through-trusses, and a truss causeway, forming the longest bridge of its kind at the time. The cantilever section was longest in the nation and third-longest anywhere.

Much of the original eastern section was founded upon treated wood pilings. Because of the very deep mud on the bay bottom, it was not practical to reach bedrock, although the lower levels of the mud are quite firm. Long wooden pilings were crafted from entire old-growth Douglas fir trees, which were driven through the soft mud to the firmer bottom layers. The construction project had casualties: twenty-four men would die while constructing the bridge.

=== Yerba Buena Tunnel ===
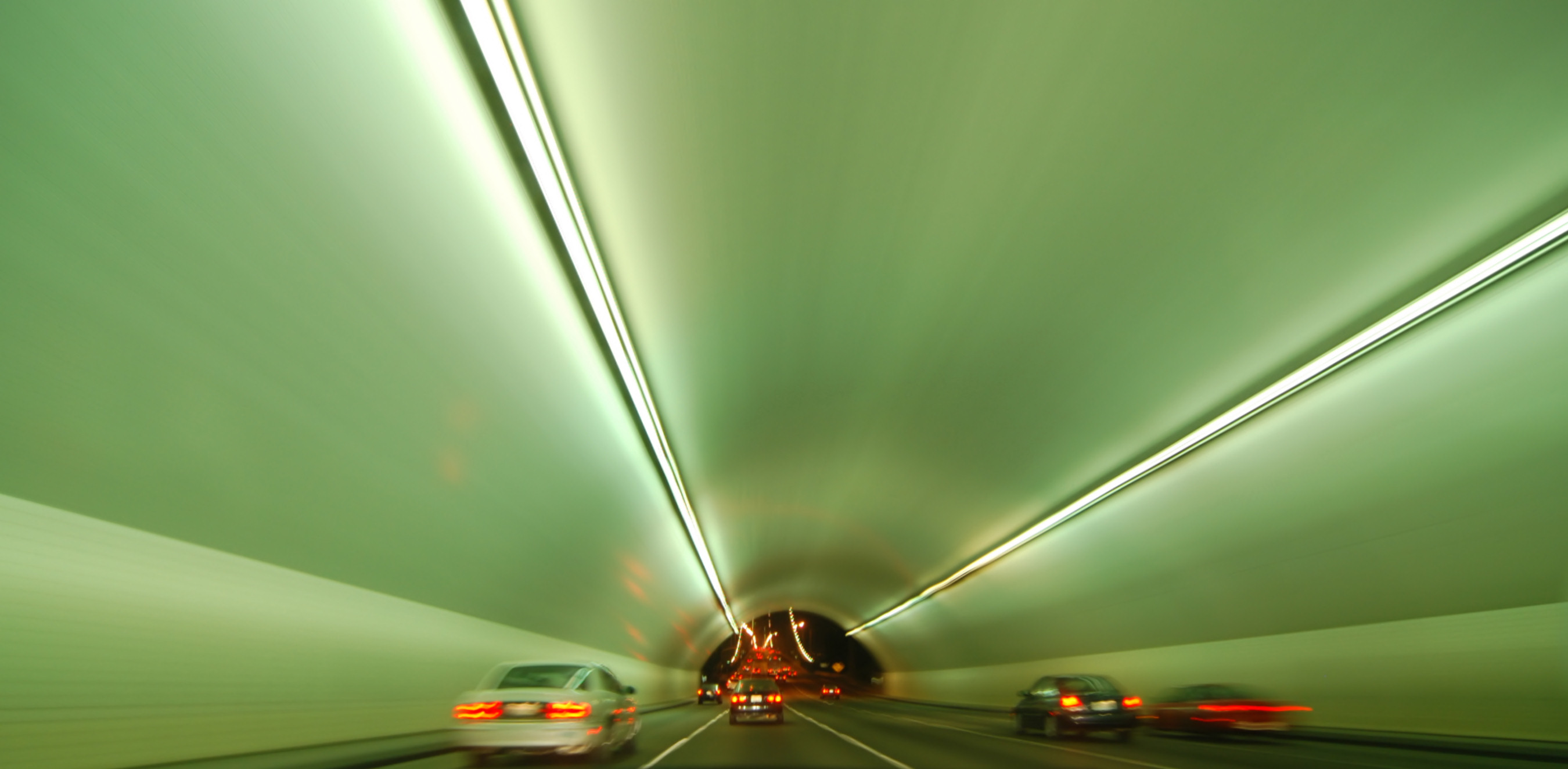
Traveling through the westbound upper level of the Yerba Buena tunnel

California Department of Transportation engineer C.H. Purcell served as chief engineer for the Bay Bridge, including the construction of the Yerba Buena Tunnel. Before starting excavation, the ground through which the western half of the tunnel would be bored was stabilized by injecting cement grout under pressure through 25 1.5-inch (38 mm) holes bored into the loose rock over the crown of the tunnel.

After excavating the western and eastern open portals, three drifts were bored from west to east along the path of the tunnel: one at the crown and the other two at the lower corners. The first drift broke through in July 1934, approximately one year after the start of construction. A ceremonial party led by Governor Merriam celebrated the completion of the first 12-foot-square (3.7 m) drift on July 24 by walking through it, followed by a short speech. The space between the three drifts was then excavated, resulting in a single arch-shaped bore (in cross-section), and the tunnel roof was constructed using 16-inch (410 mm) steel I-beam ribs spaced 3 feet (0.91 m) apart to support the rock, which were then embedded in concrete up to 3 feet (0.91 m) thick at the crown. No cave-ins occurred during the excavation of the tunnel.

After the roof was completed, the remaining core of rock between the tunnel roof and lower deck was excavated using a power shovel. By May 1935, work on removing the core was progressing and 40 steel ribs had been placed; concrete embedment was just starting. Removal of the core was completed on November 18, 1935. Once the excavation was complete, the upper deck was placed and the interior ceiling above the upper deck was lined with tiles. The last concrete poured during the construction of the Bay Bridge was part of the upper deck lining in late summer 1936. This included the emplacement of regularly spaced refuge bays ("deadman holes") along the south wall of the lower deck tunnel, escape alcoves common in all railway tunnels into which track maintenance workers could duck if a train came along. These remain and are visible to eastbound motorists today.

The completed tunnel bore is 76 feet (23 m) wide and 58 feet (18 m) high overall, and the dimensions of the tunnel interior are 66 feet (20 m) wide and 53 feet (16 m) high. In 1936, it was hailed as the world's largest-bore tunnel. The cross-sectional area of the upper half is 1,500 square feet (140 m^{2}), and the lower half is 1,000 square feet (93 m^{2}).

Reminders of the long-gone bridge railway survive along the south side of the lower Yerba Buena Tunnel. These are the regularly spaced refuge bays ("deadman holes"), escape alcoves common in all railway tunnels, along the wall, into which track maintenance workers could safely retreat if a train came along. (The north side, which always carried only motor traffic, lacks these holes.)

The tunnel is 76 feet (23 m) wide, 58 feet (18 m) high, and 540 feet (160 m) long. It is the largest diameter transportation bore tunnel in the world. The large amount of material that was excavated in boring the tunnel was used for a portion of the landfill over the shoals lying adjacent to Yerba Buena Island to its north, a project which created the artificial Treasure Island. The contract to build the Yerba Buena Cable Anchorage, Tunnel & Viaduct segment was opened for bids on March 28, 1933, and awarded to the low bidder, Clinton Construction Company of California, for $1,821,129.50 (equivalent to $35.9 million in 2025). Yerba Buena Island was the main site of the official groundbreaking for the Bay Bridge on July 9, 1933, when President Franklin D. Roosevelt remotely set off a dynamite blast on the eastern side of the island at 12:58 p.m. local time. Former President Herbert Hoover and Governor James Rolph were onsite; the two men were the first to turn over the earth with ceremonial golden spades. Other ceremonies took place simultaneously in San Francisco (on Rincon Hill) and Oakland Harbor.

The Yerba Buena Tunnel opened, along with the rest of the Bay Bridge, on November 12, 1936. As of 2026, the tunnel lacks an official name.

== Opening day ==
The bridge opened on November 12, 1936, at 12:30 p.m. In attendance was former U.S. president Herbert Hoover, Senator William G. McAdoo, and the Governor of California, Frank Merriam. Governor Merriam opened the bridge by cutting gold chains across it with an acetylene cutting torch. The San Francisco Chronicle report of November 13, 1936, read:

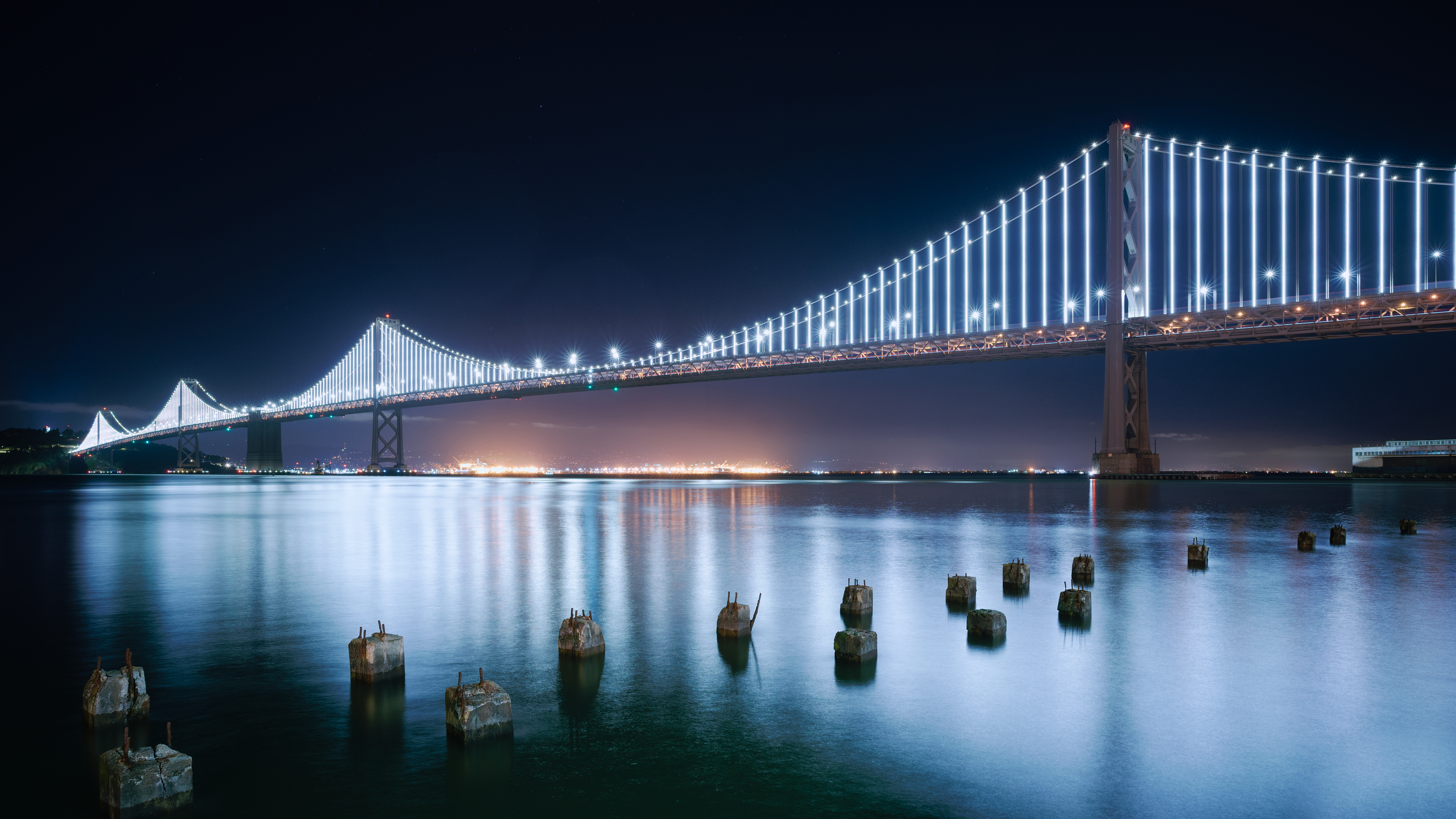
The illuminated western span as seen from the Embarcadero in San Francisco

Schematic drawing of the Bay Bridge

the greatest traffic jam in the history of S.F., a dozen old-fashioned New Year's eves thrown into one – the biggest and most good-natured crowd of tens of thousands ever to try and walk the streets and guide their autos on them – This was the city last night, the night of the bridge opening with every auto owner in the bay region, seemingly, trying to crowd his machine onto the great bridge.

And those who tried to view the brilliantly lighted structure from the hilltops and also view the fireworks display were numbered also in the thousands.

Every intersection in the city, particularly those near the San Francisco entrance to the bridge, was jammed with a slowly moving auto caravan.

Every available policeman in the department was called to duty to aid in regulating the city's greatest parade of autos.

One of the greatest traffic congestions of the evening was at Fifth and Mission Streets, with downtown traffic and bridge-bound traffic snarled in an almost hopeless mass. To add to the confusion, traffic signals jammed and did not synchronize.

Police reported that there was no lessening of the traffic over the bridge, all lanes being crowded with Oakland- or San-Francisco-bound machines far into the night.

The total cost was US$77 million (equivalent to $1.79 billion in 2025). Before opening the bridge was blessed by Cardinal Secretary of State Eugene Cardinal Pacelli, later Pope Pius XII. Because it was in effect two bridges strung together, the western spans were ranked the second and third largest suspension bridges. Only the George Washington Bridge had a longer span between towers.

As part of the celebration a United States commemorative coin was produced by the San Francisco Mint. A half dollar, the obverse portrays California's symbol, the grizzly bear, while the reverse presents a picture of the bridge spanning the bay. A total of 71,369 coins were sold, some from the bridge's tollbooths.

== Post-opening history ==
=== 1930s–1960s ===
==== The Bridge Railway ====
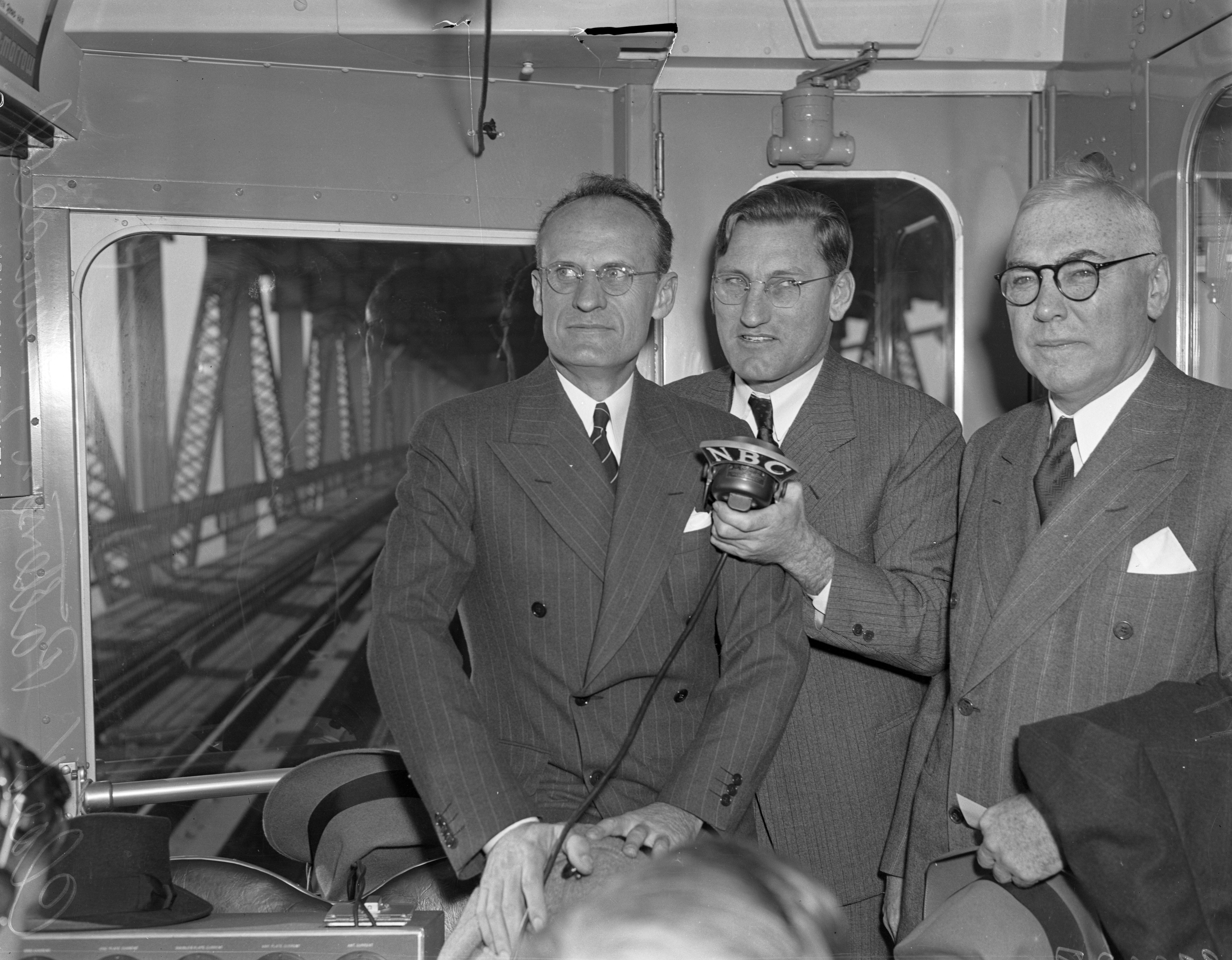
Public Works Director Frank W. Clark (left), Lieutenant Governor Ellis E. Patterson (center), and State Highway Engineer Charles H. Purcell take the first train over the Bay Bridge, January 14, 1939

Construction of the Bridge Railway began on November 29, 1937, with the laying of the first ties. The first train was run across the Bay Bridge on September 23, 1938, a test run utilizing a Key System train consisting of two articulated units with California Governor Frank Merriam at the controls. On January 14, 1939, the San Francisco Transbay Terminal was dedicated. The following morning, January 15, 1939, the electric interurban trains started in revenue service, running along the south side of the lower deck of the bridge. The terminal originally was supposed to open at the same time as the Bay Bridge, but had been delayed.

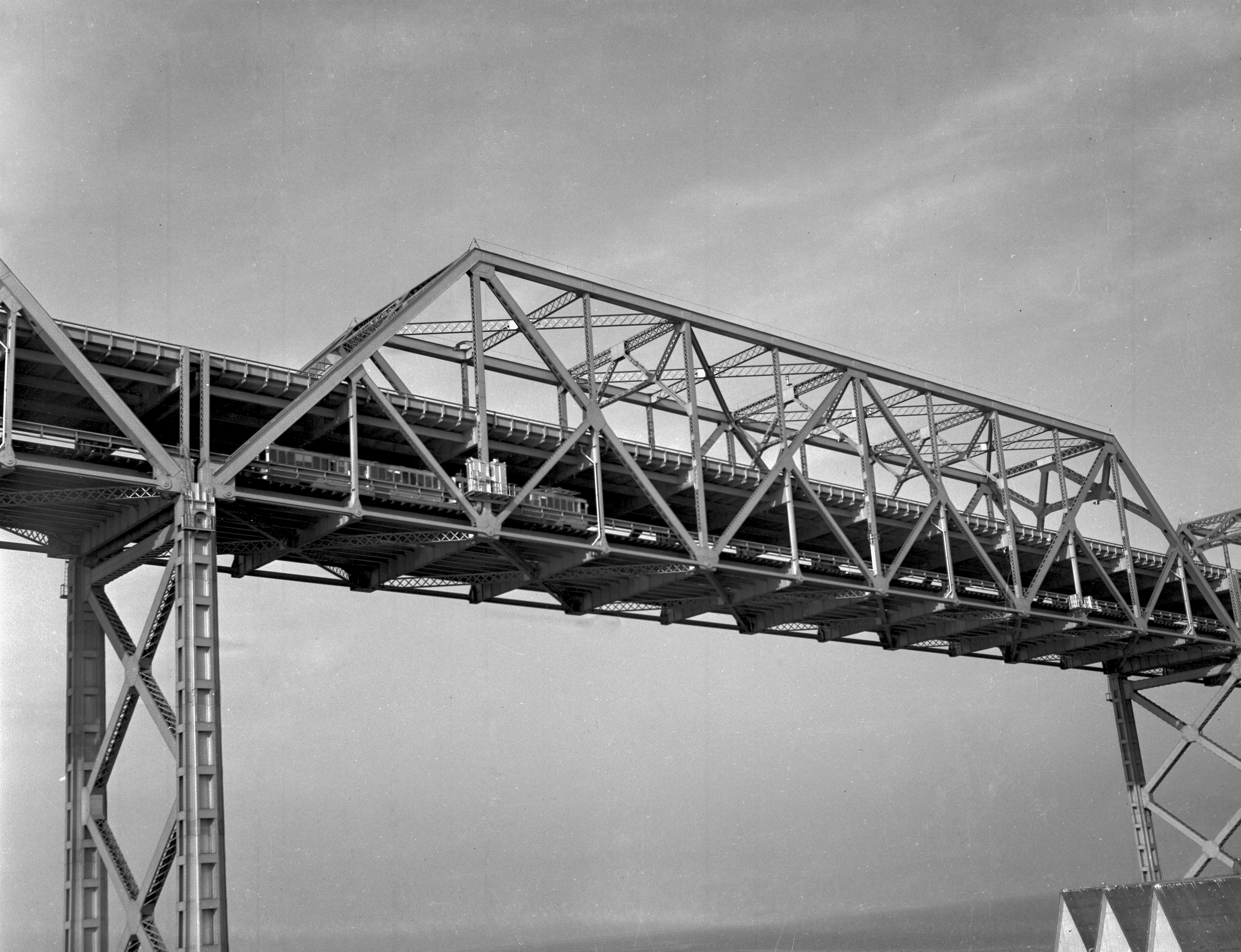
A Key System interurban crossing the bridge

Trains over the Bridge Railway were operated by the Sacramento Northern Railroad (Western Pacific), the Interurban Electric Railway (Southern Pacific) and the Key System. Freight trains never used the bridge. The tracks left the lower deck in San Francisco just southwest of the end of 1st Street. They then went along an elevated viaduct above city streets, looping around and into the terminal on its east end. Departing trains exited on the loop back onto the bridge. The loop continued to be used by buses until the terminal's closure in 2010. The tracks left the lower deck in Oakland. The Interurban Electric Railway tracks ran along Engineer Road and over the Southern Pacific yard on trestles (some of it is still standing and visible from nearby roadways) onto the streets and dedicated right-of-ways in Berkeley, Albany, Oakland and Alameda. The Sacramento Northern and Key System tracks went under the SP tracks through a tunnel (which still exists and is in use as an access to the EBMUD treatment plant) and onto 40th Street. Due to falling ridership, Sacramento Northern and IER service ended in 1941.

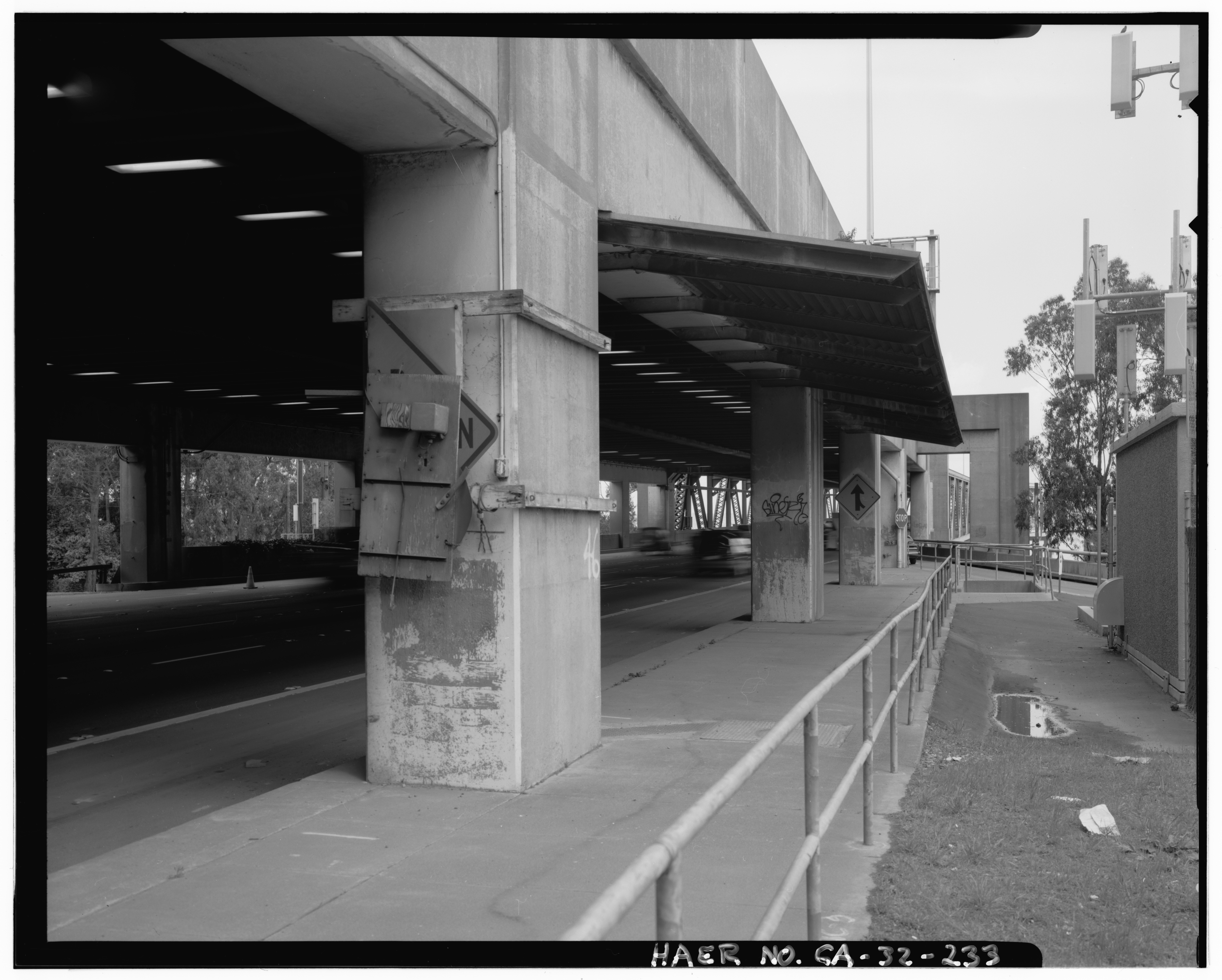
Disused passengers facilities on Yerba Buena Island for riders traveling eastbound

On September 13, 1942, a stop was opened at Yerba Buena Island to serve expanded wartime needs on the adjacent Treasure Island.

Despite the vital role the railroad played, the last train went over the bridge in April 1958. The tracks were removed and replaced with pavement on the Transbay Terminal ramps and Bay Bridge. The Key System handled buses over the bridge until 1960, when its successor, AC Transit, took over operations. It still handles service today, running to a new transbay terminal located in the same vicinity in San Francisco, the Salesforce Transit Center.

==== Emperor Norton plaque and relocation ====
In 1872, the San Francisco entrepreneur and eccentric Emperor Norton issued three proclamations calling for the design and construction of a suspension bridge between San Francisco and Oakland via Yerba Buena Island (formerly Goat Island). A 1939 plaque honoring Emperor Norton for the original idea for the Bay Bridge was dedicated by the fraternal society E Clampus Vitus and was installed at The Cliff House in February 1955. In November 1986, in connection with the bridge's 50th anniversary, the plaque was moved to the Transbay Terminal, the public transit and Greyhound bus depot at the west end of the bridge in downtown San Francisco. When the terminal was closed in 2010, the plaque was placed in storage. It was placed at the Salesforce Transit Center in September 2019 but vandalized in late 2020. In February 2021, it was removed from the center and restored. Now, it's displayed in a bar called Molloy's Tavern.

=== 1960s–2010s ===
==== Roadway retrofit ====
Until the 1960s, the upper deck (58 feet (18 m) wide between curbs) carried three lanes of traffic in each direction and was restricted to automobiles only. The lower deck carried three lanes of truck and bus traffic, with autos allowed, on the north side of the bridge. In the 1950s, traffic lights were added to set the direction of travel in the middle lane, but there still remained no divider. Two interurban railroad tracks on the south half of the lower deck carried the electric commuter trains. In 1958, the tracks were replaced with pavement, but the reconfiguration to what the traffic eventually became did not take place until 1963.

The Federal highway on the bridge was originally a concurrency of U.S. Highway 40 and U.S. Highway 50. The bridge was re-designated as Interstate 80 in 1964, and the western ends of U.S. 40 and U.S. 50 are now in Silver Summit, Utah, and West Sacramento, California, respectively.

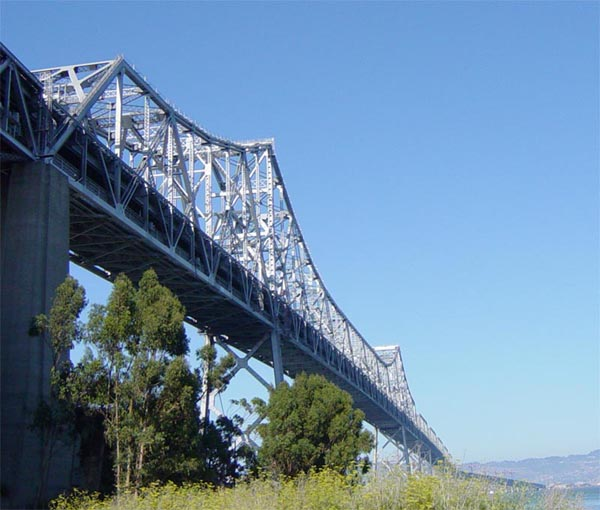
A double balanced cantilever bridge, five truss bridges, and two truss causeways that connected Yerba Buena Island to Oakland. It was replaced by the current SAS span and was dismantled in 2016.

==== Reconstruction of approaches ====
The original western approach to (and exit from) the upper deck of the bridge was a long ramp to Fifth Street, branching to Harrison Street for westward traffic off the bridge and Bryant Street for eastward traffic entering. There was also an on-ramp to the upper deck on Rincon Hill from Fremont Street (which later became an off-ramp) and an off-ramp to First Street (later extended over First Street to Fremont Street). The lower deck ended at Essex and Harrison Street; just southwest of there, the tracks of the bridge railway left the lower deck and curved northward into the elevated loop through the Transbay Terminal that was paved for buses after rail service ended.

The eastern approach to the bridge included a causeway landing for the "incline" section, and the construction of three feeder highways, interlinked by an extensive interchange, which in later years became known as "The MacArthur Maze". A massive landfill was emplaced, extending along the north edge of the existing Key System rail mole to the existing bayshore, and continuing northward along the shore to the foot of Ashby Avenue in Berkeley. The fill was continued northward to the foot of University Avenue as a causeway which enclosed an artificial lagoon, subsequently developed by the WPA as "Aquatic Park". The three feeder highways were U.S. Highway 40 (Eastshore Highway) which led north through Berkeley, U.S. Highway 50 (38th Street, later MacArthur Blvd.) which led through Oakland, and State Route 17 which ran parallel to U.S. 50, along the Oakland Estuary and through the industrial and port sections of the city.

The current approaches were constructed in the 1960s, as the original ones were not up to interstate highway standards and were designed mainly for local use.

==== Yerba Buena Tunnel reconstruction ====
As originally completed, the upper deck was reserved for automobile traffic, and carried six lanes, each 9 feet 8 inches (2.95 m) wide. The lower deck was further divided into three lanes of traffic for heavy trucks (each 10 feet 4 inches [3.15 m] wide), and the two railroad tracks on the south side (27 feet [8.2 m] wide for both tracks). The initial design in 1932 called for the two rail tracks to flank a central truck deck on the lower level. After Key System trains stopped running over the bridge in 1958, bids were opened on October 11, 1960, to rebuild the tunnel. The rebuild consisted of multiple stages of work:

1. Remove Key System rails, lower rail deck and repave
2. Lower the truck traffic half of the lower deck by 3 feet (0.91 m) and repave
3. Remove center columns supporting upper deck
4. Lower the upper deck by 16 inches (410 mm) by placing precast concrete units

After the reconstruction, the tunnel would handle only road traffic. The upper deck was lowered to accommodate heavy truck traffic, as each deck would now carry five lanes of unidirectional traffic. The upper deck was dedicated to westbound traffic, and the lower deck was dedicated to eastbound traffic. The impact to traffic during reconstruction of the tunnel was minimized mainly by working outside normal commuting hours and through the use of a portable steel bridge 26 feet (7.9 m) long and 58 feet (18 m) wide, designed to fit between the curbs of the existing upper deck. The bridge spanned the gap between the new upper deck and old upper deck, and the overall elevation change of 26 inches (660 mm) caused drivers to slow to 15 miles per hour (24 km/h), resulting in traffic jams. The first accident caused by "The Hump", the nickname the bridge acquired after prominent warning signs advertising its presence, occurred just twelve minutes after it was first deployed on November 25, 1961.

The new precast upper deck units were each 7 feet 8 inches (2.34 m) long and were installed in two halves. One side of each half rested on a temporary falsework erected in the middle of the lower deck, and the other side rested on the shoulder of the tunnel wall previously used to support the old upper deck. After the two halves were fastened together, a steel form was used to close the 1-foot-6-inch-wide (0.46 m) gap between halves, and concrete was poured in the gap. The upper deck rests on 12-inch-wide (30 cm) shoulders built into the tunnel wall, padded by 1/2-inch-thick (1.3 cm) Masonite.

The planned completion date for tunnel reconstruction was July 1962, but "The Hump" was not dismantled until October 27, 1962. The San Francisco Chronicle marked the occasion by quipping "[The Hump] produced more jams than Grandma ever made." After reconstruction, both the upper and lower decks featured 16 feet (4.9 m) of vertical clearance. Upper deck clearance is restricted by the tunnel portal, and lower deck clearance is restricted by the upper deck.

==== Rail removal ====
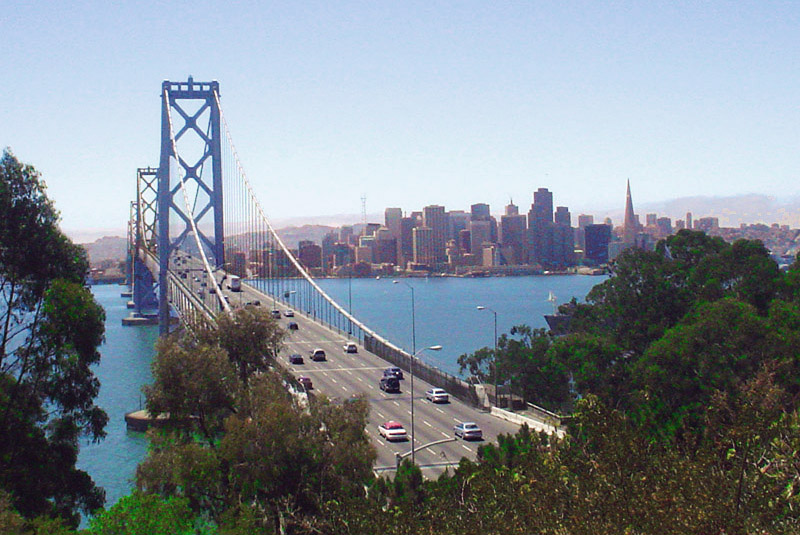
Daytime view of the Bay Bridge and San Francisco seen from Yerba Buena Island in 2011

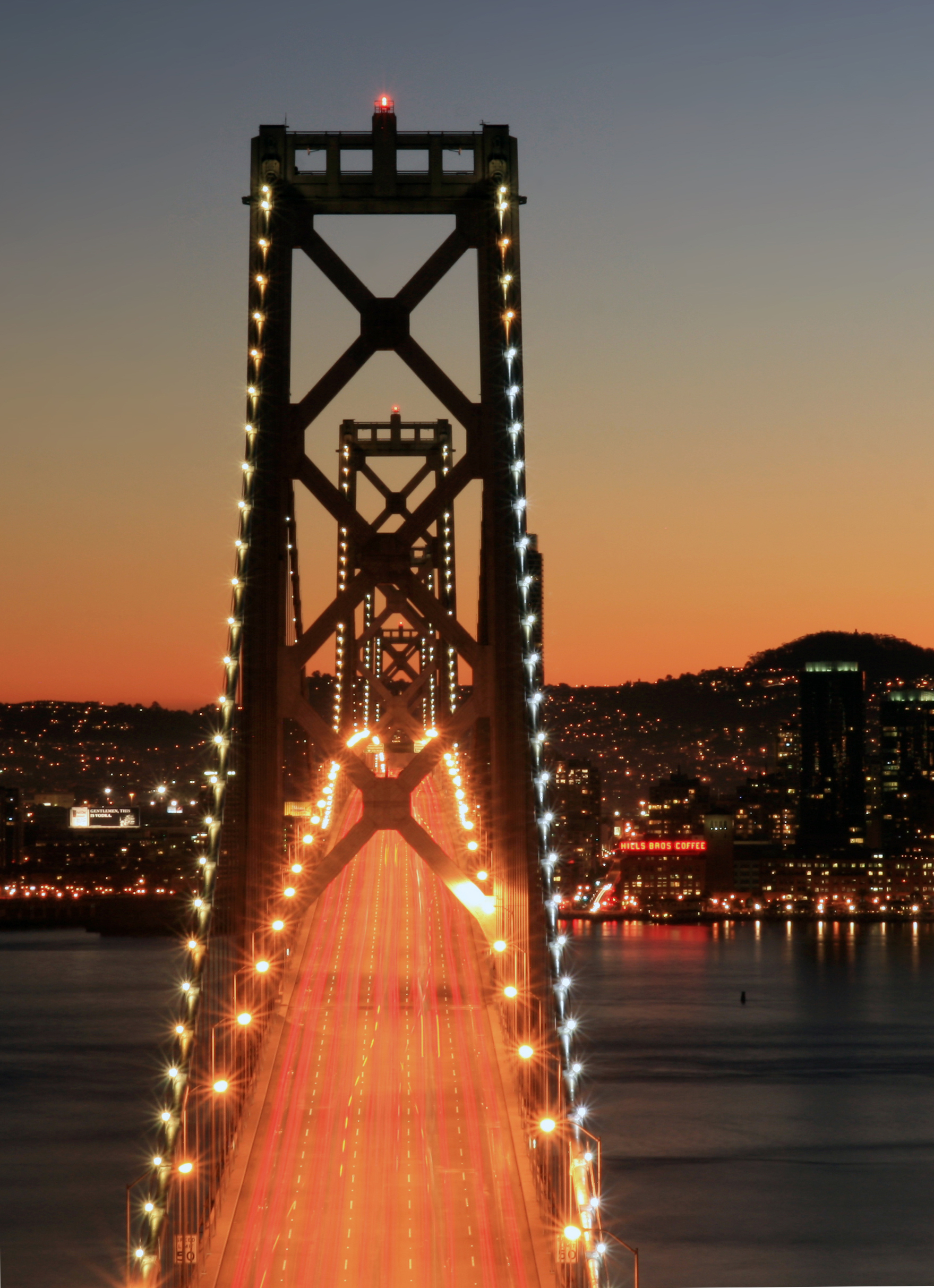
Nighttime illumination of the Bay Bridge

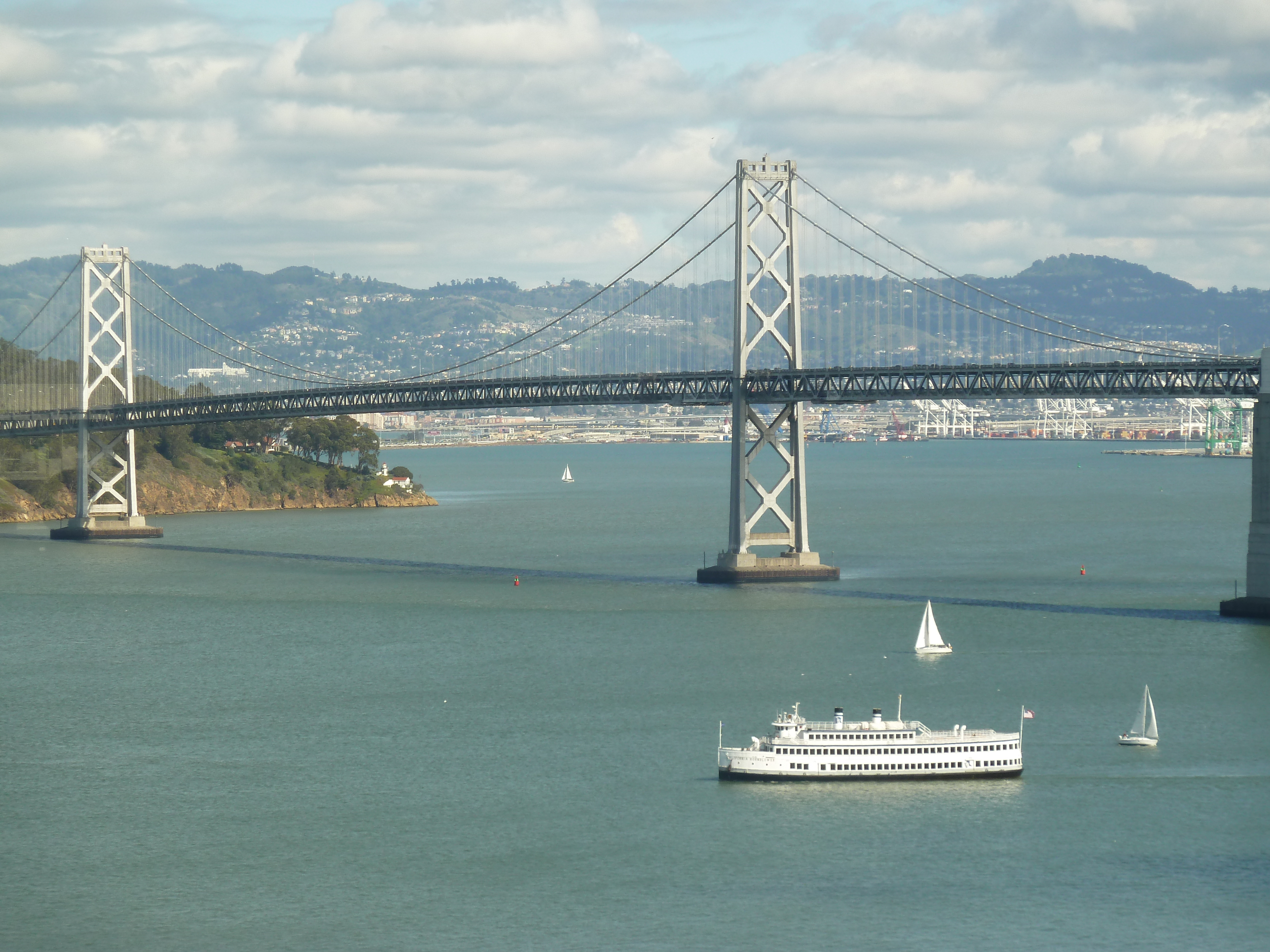
A view of the Bay Bridge from the Bank of America building in 2012

Automobile traffic increased dramatically in the ensuing decades of the bridge's opening. This, among other things, resulted in the Key System's decline. By the 1960s, having rails on the bridge had become obsolete and a detriment to traffic, as they carried nothing on them. Work began on removing the tracks in October 1963. After the work was completed, the Bay Bridge was reconfigured with five lanes of westbound traffic on the upper deck and five lanes of eastbound traffic on the lower deck. The Key System originally planned to end train operations in 1948, when it replaced its streetcars with buses, but Caltrans did not approve of this. Trucks had their ban lifted and were allowed on the top deck for the first time. Due to this, the upper deck was retrofitted to handle the increased loads, with understringers added and prestressing added to the bottom of the floor beams. This retrofit is still in place today and is visible to Eastbound traffic on the western span.

In current times, there have been attempts to restore rail service to the bridge, but none were successful. A study released in 2000 estimated the cost of restoring rail service across the bridge at up to $8 billion ($15 billion in 2025).

==== 1968 aircraft accident ====
On February 11, 1968, a U.S. Navy training aircraft crashed into the cantilevered span of the bridge, killing both reserve officers aboard. The T2V SeaStar, based at NAS Los Alamitos in southern California, was on a routine weekend mission and had just taken off in the fog from nearby NAS Alameda. The plane struck the bridge about 15 feet (5 m) above the upper deck roadway and then sank in the bay north of the bridge. There were no injuries among the motorists on the bridge. One of the truss sections of the bridges was replaced due to damage from the impact.

==== 1986 cable lighting ====
The series of lights adorning the westbound spans suspension cables were added in 1986, as part of the bridge's 50th-anniversary celebration, after lobbying by Caltrans engineer Robert Halligan. The lighting, which was intended to be temporary, was later made permanent.

==== James Rolph Jr. dedication ====
The bridge was unofficially "dedicated" to James "Sunny Jim" Rolph, Jr., but this was not widely recognized until the bridge's 50th-anniversary celebrations in 1986. The name of the bridge for all functional purposes has always been the "San Francisco–Oakland Bay Bridge" and, by most local people, it is referred to simply as "the Bay Bridge". Rolph, a Mayor of San Francisco from 1912 to 1931, was the Governor of California at the time construction of the bridge began. He died in office on June 2, 1934, two years before the bridge opened, leaving the bridge to be named for him out of respect.

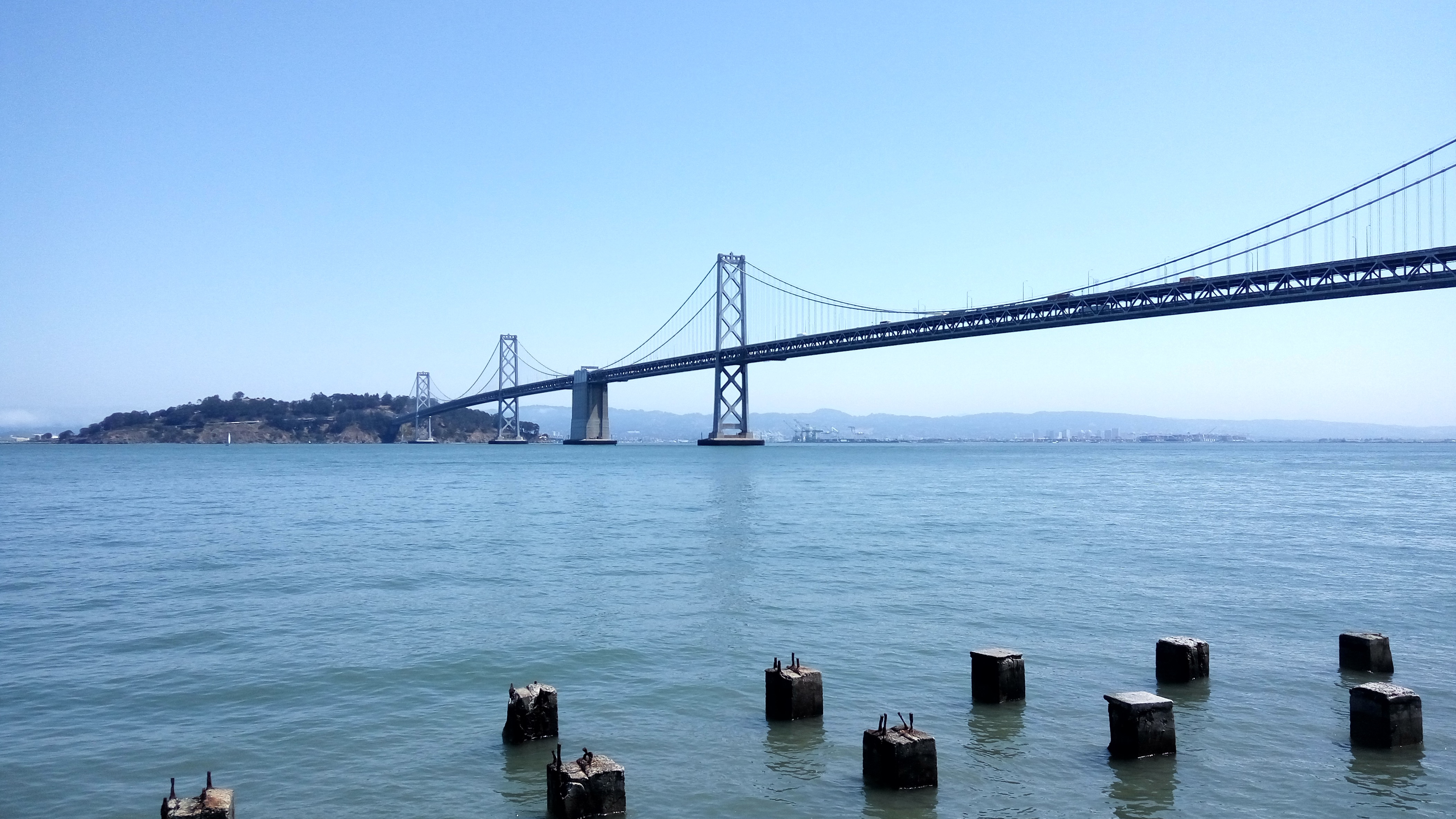
A view of the San Francisco-Oakland Bay Bridge western span from the waterfront in San Francisco

==== 1989 Loma Prieta earthquake and emergency repairs ====
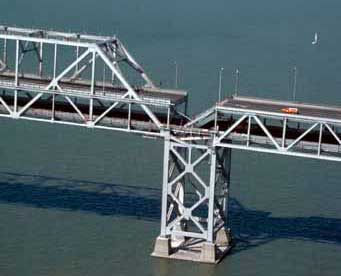
A collapsed section of roadway deck after the 1989 earthquake

On the evening of October 17, 1989, during the Loma Prieta earthquake, which measured a 6.9 on the moment magnitude scale, a 50-foot (15 m) section of the upper deck of the eastern truss portion of the bridge at Pier E9 collapsed onto the deck below, indirectly causing one death. The bridge was closed for just over a month as construction crews repaired the section. That same year, the bridge reopened to traffic on November 18.

==== 2001 terrorism threat ====
On November 2, 2001, in the aftermath of the September 11 attacks, Governor Gray Davis announced a threat of a rush hour attack against a West Coast suspension bridge (a group which includes the Bay Bridge and the Golden Gate Bridge) some time between November 2 and 7, resulting in an increase of openly armed law enforcement patrols.

A small fraction of drivers shifted to ferries and BART. It was later revealed that crews had secretly been working under armed guard for several weeks to harden the suspension cable attachment points, which were vulnerable to cutting with common weapons and tools. An anchor room was filled with concrete, doors welded shut, and a razor wire fence added. A blast wall was also added to defend against a potential truck bomb. In the end, no attack occurred.

==== Emperor Norton naming campaign ====
In November 2004, after a campaign by San Francisco Chronicle cartoonist Phil Frank, then-San Francisco District 3 Supervisor Aaron Peskin introduced a resolution to the San Francisco Board of Supervisors calling for the entire two-bridge system, from San Francisco to Oakland, to be named for Emperor Norton.

On December 14, 2004, the Board approved a modified version of this resolution, calling for only "new additions"—i.e., the new eastern crossing—to be named "The Emperor Norton Bridge". Neither the City of Oakland nor Alameda County passed any similar resolution, so the effort went no further.

==== Western span retrofit ====
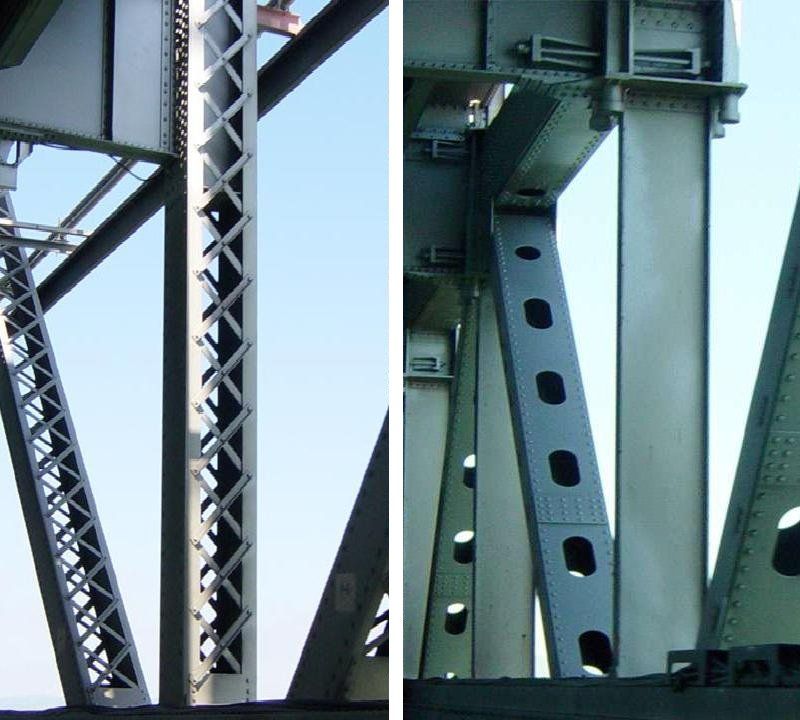
Obsolete hot riveted laced ties (left, original eastern span) and bolted box beam retrofit (right, western span)

The western section has undergone extensive seismic retrofitting. During the retrofit, much of the structural steel supporting the bridge deck was replaced while the bridge remained open to traffic. Engineers accomplished this by using methods similar to those employed on the Chicago Skyway.

The entire bridge was fabricated using hot steel rivets, which are impossible to heat treat and so remain relatively soft. Analysis showed that these could fail by shearing under extreme stress. Therefore, at most locations, rivets were replaced with high-strength bolts. Most bolts had domed heads placed facing traffic so they looked similar to the rivets that were removed. This work had to be performed with great care as the steel of the structure had for many years been painted with lead paint, which had to be carefully removed and contained by workers with extensive protective gear so that they would not be exposed to the toxic lead paint.

Most of the beams were originally constructed of two plate Ɪ-beams joined with lattices of flat strip or angle stock, depending upon structural requirements. These have all been reconstructed by replacing the riveted lattice elements with bolted steel plate and so converting the lattice beams into box beams. This replacement included adding face plates to the large diagonal beams joining the faces of the main towers, which now have an improved appearance when viewed from certain angles.

Diagonal box beams have been added to each bay of the upper and lower decks of the western spans. These add stiffness to reduce side-to-side motion during an earthquake and reduce the probability of damage to the decking surfaces.

Analysis showed that some massive concrete supports could burst and crumble under likely stresses. In particular, the Western supports were extensively modified. First, the location of the existing reinforcing bar is determined using magnetic techniques. In areas between bars, holes are drilled. Into these holes is inserted and glued an L-shaped bar that protrudes 15 to 25 cm (6 to 10 in). This bar is retained in the hole with a high-strength epoxy adhesive. The entire surface of the structure is thus covered with closely spaced protrusions. A network of horizontal and vertical reinforcing bars is then attached to these protrusions. Mold surface plates are then positioned to retain high-strength concrete, which is then pumped into the void. After removal of the formwork, the surface appears similar to the original concrete. This technique has been applied elsewhere throughout California to improve freeway overpass abutments and some overpass central supports that have unconventional shapes. (Other techniques such as jacket and grout are applied to simple vertical posts; see the seismic retrofit article.)

The Western approaches have also been retrofitted in part, but mostly these have been replaced with new construction of reinforced concrete.

==== 2007 Cosco Busan oil spill ====
In 2007, a container ship then named the Cosco Busan, and subsequently renamed the Hanjin Venezia, collided with the Delta Tower fender, resulting in the Cosco Busan oil spill.

==== October 2009 eyebar crack, repair failure and bridge closure ====
During the 2009 Labor Day weekend (Note: September 5, 2009 to September 7, 2009) closure for a portion of the replacement, a major crack was found in an eyebar, significant enough to warrant bridge closure. Working in parallel with the retrofit, California Department of Transportation (Caltrans), and its contractors and subcontractors, were able to design, engineer, fabricate, and install the pieces required to repair the bridge, delaying its planned opening by only 1 1/2 hours. The repair was not inspected by the Federal Highway Administration, which relied on state inspection reports to ensure safety guidelines were met.

On October 27, 2009, during the evening commute, the steel crossbeam and two steel tie rods repaired over Labor Day weekend snapped off the Bay Bridge's eastern section and fell to the upper deck. This may have been due to metal-on-metal vibration from bridge traffic and wind gusts of up to 55 miles per hour (90 km/h), which resulted in one of the rods breaking off and caused one of the metal sections to come crashing down. Three vehicles were either struck by or hit the fallen debris, though there were no injuries. On November 1, Caltrans announced that the bridge would probably stay closed at least through the morning commute of Monday, November 2 after repairs performed during the weekend failed a stress test on Sunday. BART and the Golden Gate Ferry systems added supplemental service to accommodate the increased passenger load during the bridge closure. The bridge reopened to traffic on November 2, 2009.

The pieces that broke off on October 27 were a saddle, crossbars, and two tension rods.

=== 2010s–present ===
==== Willie L. Brown, Jr., Bridge naming ====
In June 2013, Assemblymember Isadore Hall III, representing Assembly District 64 (portions of Los Angeles and Orange Counties), introduced Assembly Concurrent Resolution No. 65 (ACR 65) to name the western crossing of the bridge for former California Assembly Speaker and former San Francisco Mayor Willie Brown. Hall introduced the resolution as lead author at the request of the measure's sponsor, the California NAACP; there were 10 co-authors. Six weeks later, a grassroots petition was launched seeking to name the entire two-bridge system for Emperor Norton. In September 2013, the petition's author launched a nonprofit, The Emperor's Bridge Campaign—now known as The Emperor Norton Trust—that advocated for adding "Emperor Norton Bridge" as an honorary name (rather than "renaming" the bridge) and that undertakes other efforts to advance Norton's legacy. The state legislative resolution naming the western section of the Bay Bridge the "Willie L. Brown, Jr., Bridge" passed the Assembly in August 2013 and the Senate in September 2013. A ceremony was held on February 11, 2014, marking the resolution and the installation of signs on either end of the section.

==== Eastern span replacement ====
For various reasons, the eastern section would have been too expensive to retrofit compared to replacing it, so the decision was made to replace it.

The replacement section underwent a series of design changes, both progressive and regressive, with increasing cost estimates and contractor bids. The final design included a single-towered self-anchored suspension span starting at Yerba Buena island, leading to a long inclined viaduct to the Oakland touchdown.

Separated and protected bicycle lanes are a visually prominent feature on the south side of the new eastern section. The bikeway and pedestrian path across the eastern span opened in October 2016 and carry recreational and commuter cyclists between Oakland and Yerba Buena Island. The original eastern cantilever span had firefighting dry standpipes installed. No firefighting dry or wet standpipes were designed for the eastern section replacement, although, the firefighting wet standpipes do exist on the original western section visible on both the north-side upper and lower decks.

The original eastern section closed permanently to traffic on August 28, 2013, and the replacement span opened for traffic five days later. The original eastern section was dismantled between January 2014 and November 2017.

Eastern span: original and replacement

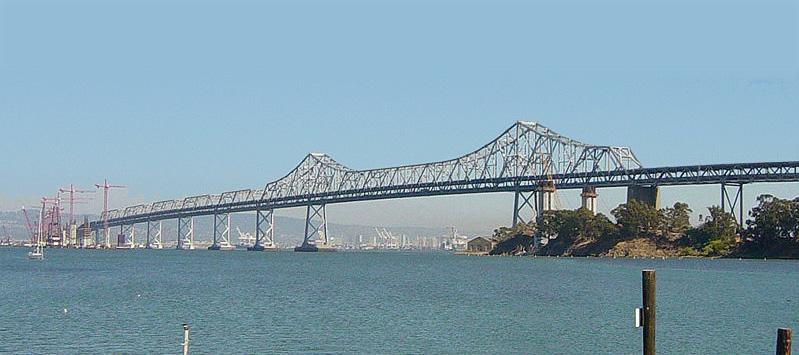
Some new construction (2004)

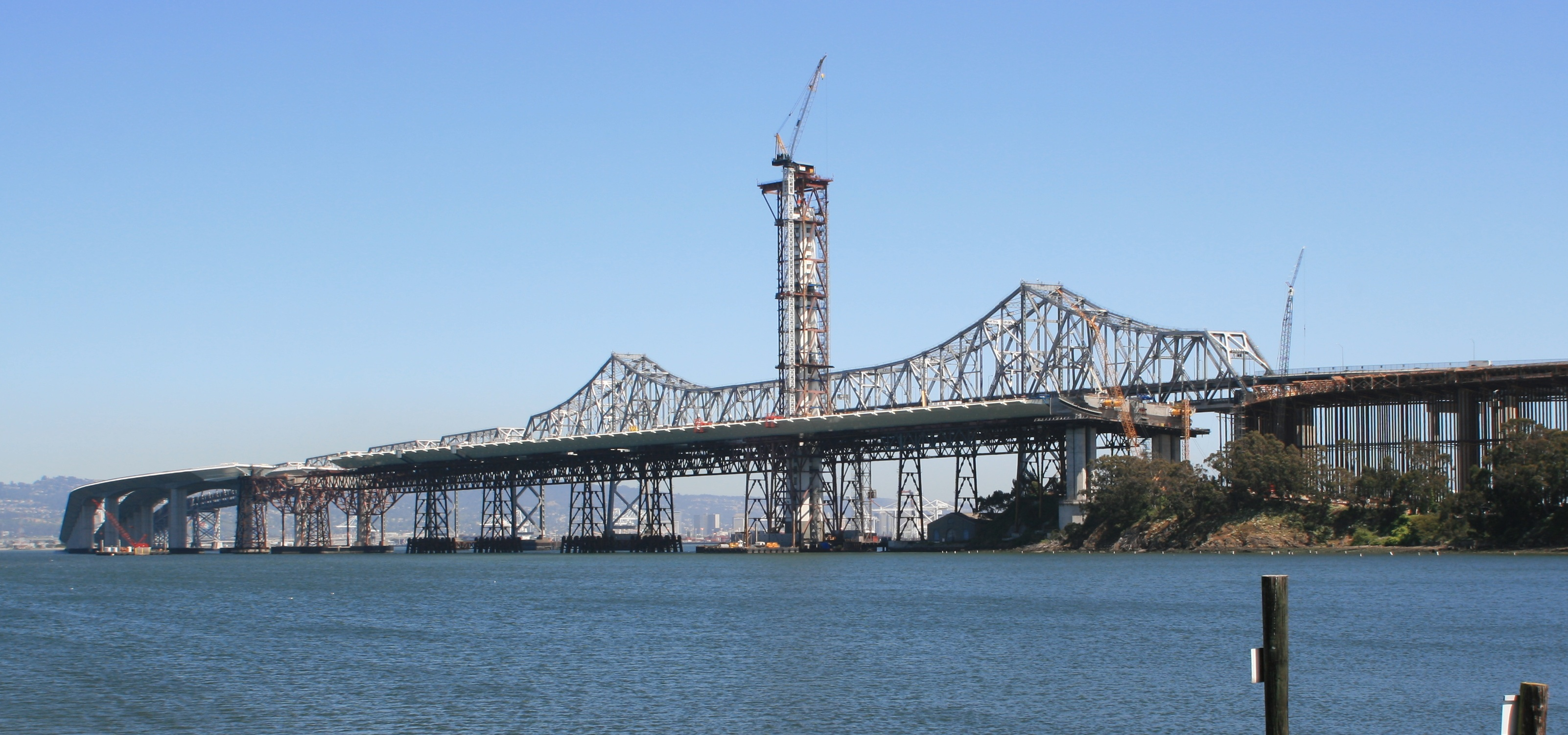
Substantial progress (2011)

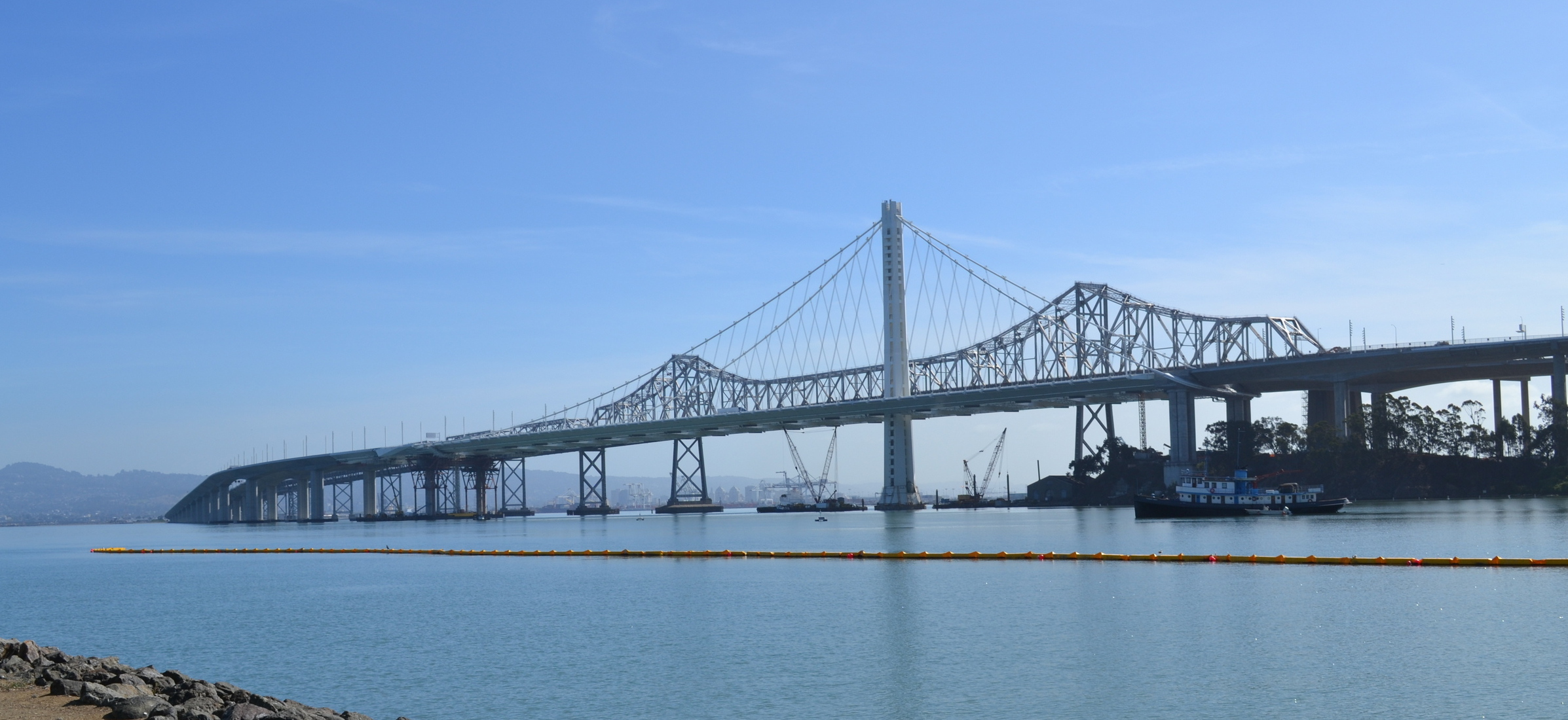
The completed replacement and the old bridge (2013)

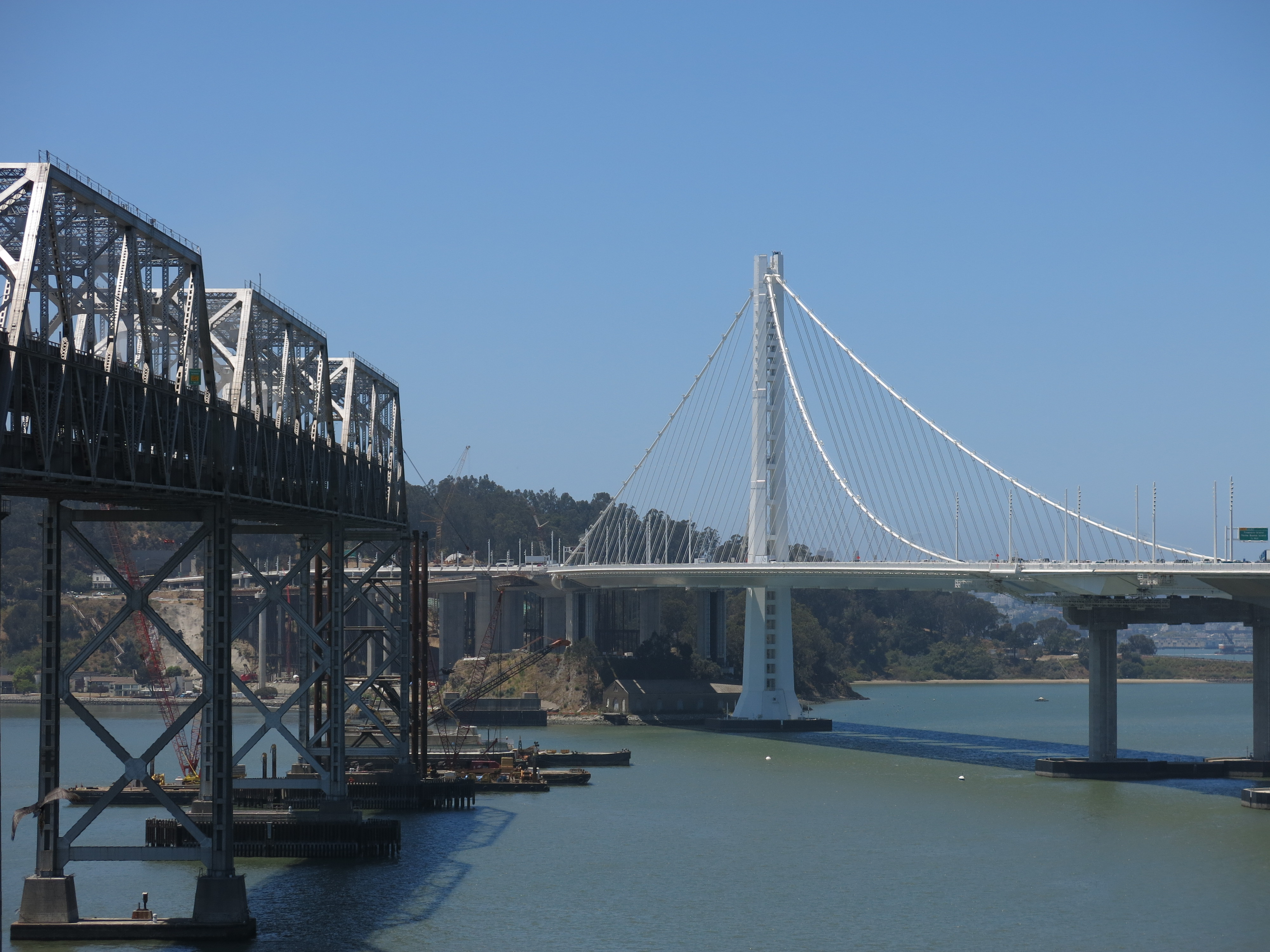
Rest of old and new bridge (June 2015)

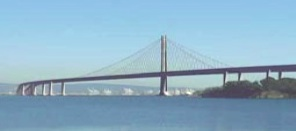
Artist's simulation of final appearance after old span demolition

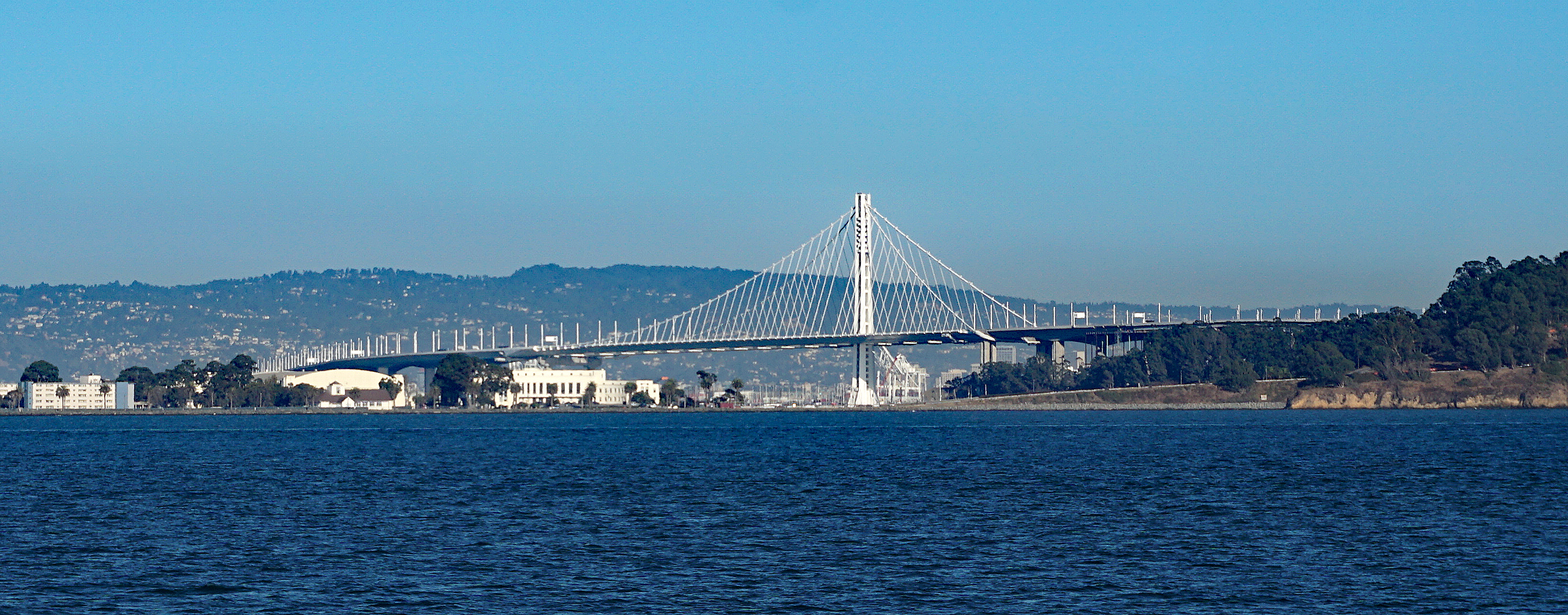
The eastern span after the old span was removed (2017)

==== 2013 public "light sculpture" installation ====
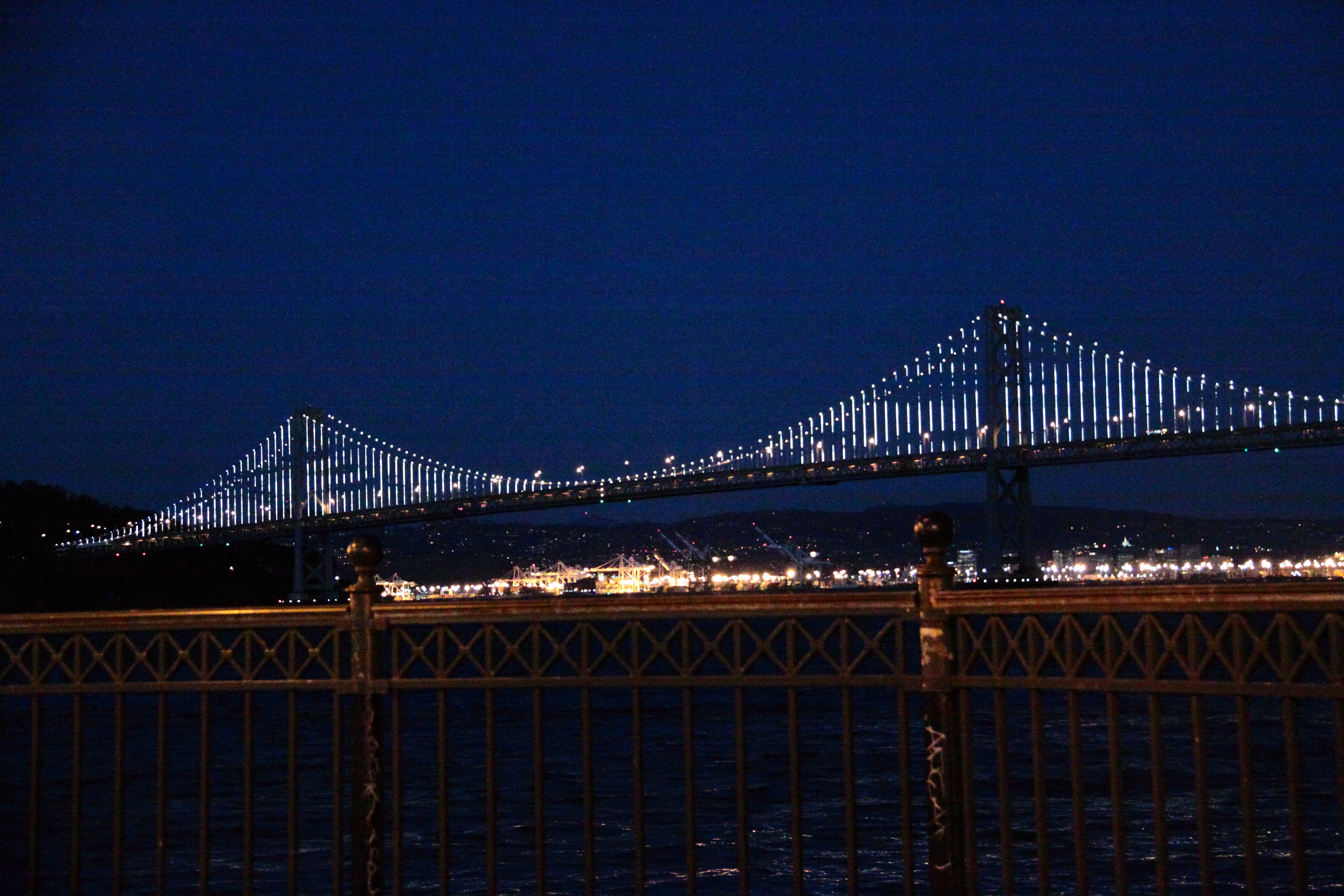
A view of Bay Bridge lights from a pier next to the Ferry Building in San Francisco (2014)

On March 5, 2013, a public art installation called "The Bay Lights" was activated on the western span's vertical cables. The installation was designed by artist Leo Villareal and consists of 25,000 LED lights originally scheduled to be on nightly display until March 2015. However, on December 17, 2014, the non-profit Illuminate The Arts announced that it had raised the $4 million needed to make the lights permanent; the display was temporarily turned off starting in March 2015 in order to perform maintenance and install sturdier bulbs and then re-lit on January 30, 2016.

In order to reduce driver distractions, the privately funded display is not visible to users of the bridge, only to distant observers. This lighting effort is intended to form part of a larger project to "light the bay". Villareal used various algorithms to generate patterns such as rainfall, reflections on water, bird flight, expanding rings, and others. Villareal's patterns and transitions will be sequenced and their duration determined by a computerized random number generator to make each viewing experience unique. Owing to the efficiency of the LED system employed, the estimated operating cost is only US$15.00 per night.

The lights were switched off permanently at 8 pm on March 5, 2023 – the 10th anniversary of the artwork. This was done due to their poor condition and increasing costs to maintain them properly. There is a plan to raise additional funds and install a new set of lights later in the year.

==== Alexander Zuckermann Bike Path ====
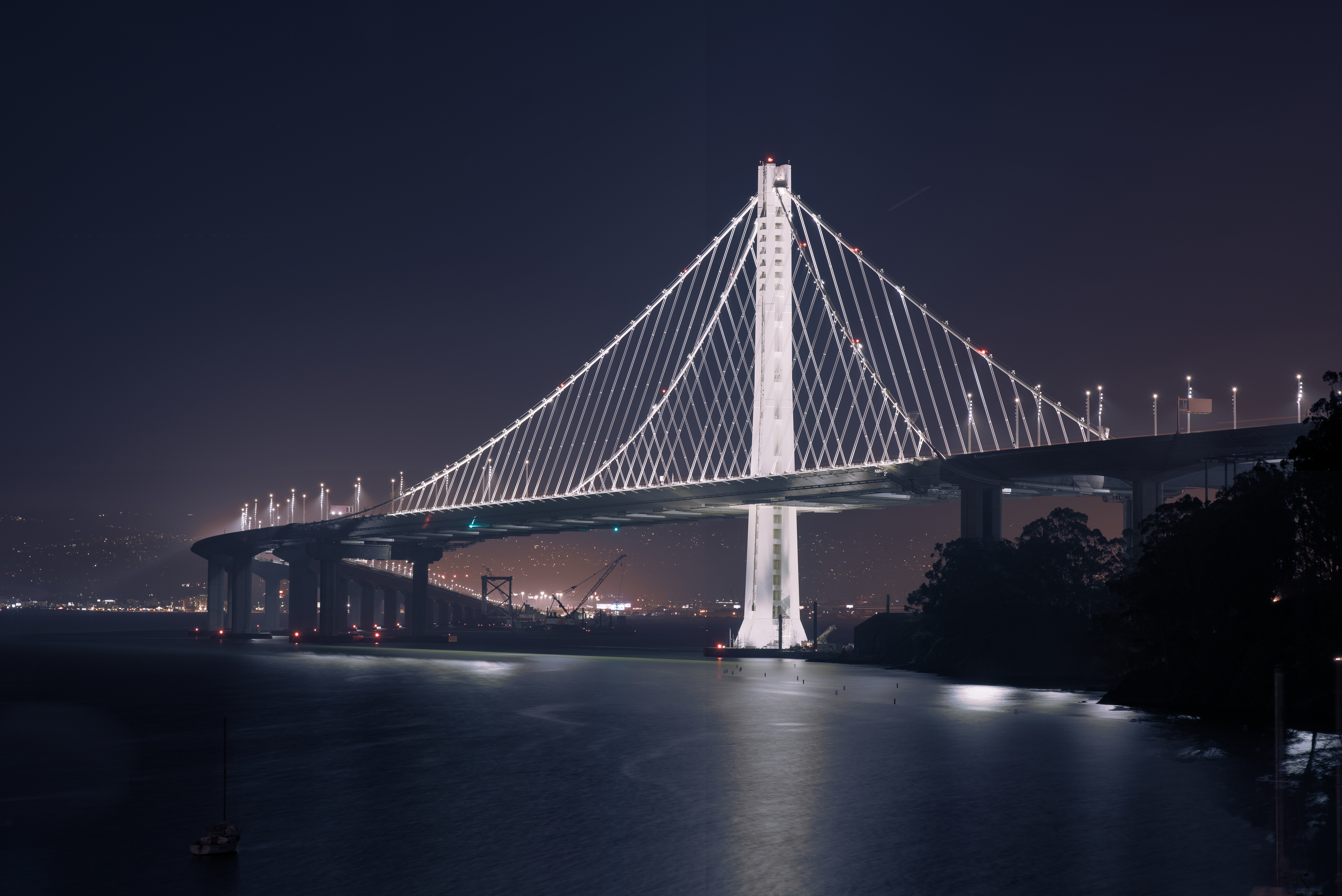
The eastern span at night in 2017

The pedestrian and bicycle route on the eastern section opened on September 3, 2013, and is named after Alexander Zuckermann, founding chair of the East Bay Bicycle Coalition. This forms a transbay route for the San Francisco Bay Trail. Until October 2016, the path did not connect to Yerba Buena and Treasure Island sidewalks, due to the need to demolish more of the old eastern section before final construction. On May 2, 2017, public access was extended to seven days a week, 6 a.m. to 9 p.m., with occasional closure days for continued demolition of the old bridge foundations. This work was completed on November 11, 2017.

==== Yerba Buena Tunnel closure and repair ====
On January 30, 2016, a chunk of concrete the size of an automobile tire fell from the tunnel wall into the slow lane of eastbound traffic on the lower deck of the Yerba Buena Tunnel, causing a minor accident. The concrete fell from where the upper deck is connected to the tunnel wall. Based on an examination of photographs, a professor from Georgia Tech postulated that water infiltration into the concrete wall had caused the reinforcing steel to corrode and expand, forcing a chunk of the tunnel wall out. A subsequent California Department of Transportation (Caltrans) investigation identified 12 spots on both sides of the tunnel wall in the lower deck space that showed signs of corrosion-induced damage, but no immediate risk of further spalling. The apparent cause was rainwater leaking from upper deck drains. Caltrans engineers speculated that the Masonite pads had swelled due to rainwater infiltration, cracking the tunnel walls and allowing moisture into the reinforcing steel. Repairs to the degraded concrete started in February 2017. Drains and catch basins were replaced to reduce the likelihood of clogging, and fiberglass-reinforced mortar was used to patch removed concrete. The repairs, which required some daytime lane closures, were expected to last until June 2017.

==== 2020 bus lane proposal ====
In January 2020, the AC Transit and BART boards of directors supported the establishment of dedicated bus lanes on the bridge. In February 2020, Rob Bonta introduced state legislation to begin planning bus lanes on the bridge.

==== Judge John Sutter Regional Shoreline ====
On October 21, 2020, Judge John Sutter Regional Shoreline park opened to the public. Located at the foot of the bridge, the opening of the park has led to easier access to the Alexander Zuckermann Bike Path due to improved parking and pedestrian access.

==== 2016–2023 exit reconstructions ====
In the 1960s era directional reconfiguration, there were three off-ramps added to Yerba Buena Island and Treasure Island: a single left-hand side exit in the western direction at the east end of the tunnel; a left-hand side exit in the eastern direction at the west end of the tunnel (originally signed as just "Treasure Island"); and a right-hand side exit in eastern direction at the east end of the tunnel (originally signed as just "Yerba Buena Island"). The eastbound left exit in particular presented an unusual hazard – drivers had to slow within the normal traffic flow and move into a very short off-ramp that ended in a short radius turn left turn; accordingly, a 15 MPH advisory was posted there. The turn had been further narrowed from its original design by the installation of crash pads on the island side. The eastbound and westbound on-ramps were then on the usual right-hand side, but they did not have dedicated merge lanes, forcing drivers to await gaps in traffic and then accelerate from a stop sign to traffic speeds in a short distance. In 2016, a new on-ramp and off-ramp at the east end of the tunnel was opened in the western direction on the right-hand side of the roadway, replacing the left-hand side off-ramp in that direction. Meanwhile, the eastbound right-hand side off-ramp and on-ramp at the east end of the tunnel was demolished during the reconstruction of the eastern span of the bridge. A new on-ramp on this side was built with a dedicated merge lane, but the off-ramp's replacement was not completed until early-May 2023, well after the bridge's bike path from the Oakland side to the island was fully completed. The eastbound left-hand side off-ramp and westbound on-ramp at the west end of the tunnel are then scheduled to close as early as late-May 2023, while the western span undergoes a seismic retrofit.

==== "Emperor Norton Tunnel" naming proposal (2025–present) ====
In August 2025, The Emperor Norton Trust introduced a proposal that the California state legislature name the bridge's tunnel through Yerba Buena Island the "Emperor Norton Tunnel" in 2026—the 90th anniversary of the bridge and the 180th anniversary of Emperor Norton's original arrival in the United States in 1846.

In August 2026, California State Senator Scott Wiener adopted and advanced this proposal as Senate Concurrent Resolution 193. The resolution was co-authored by Assemblymember Catherine Stefani. The Trust was the citizen sponsor.

SCR 193 passed the Senate unanimously, 39–0. But, under Assembly rules that put up high bars to expediting any measure in the final two weeks of the session, SCR 193 received neither committee nor floor votes in the Assembly.

The Emperor Norton Trust has announced its commitment to seeing this resolution reintroduced in the 2027–2028 legislative session, which opens December 2026.

== Financing and tolls ==
=== Current toll rates ===
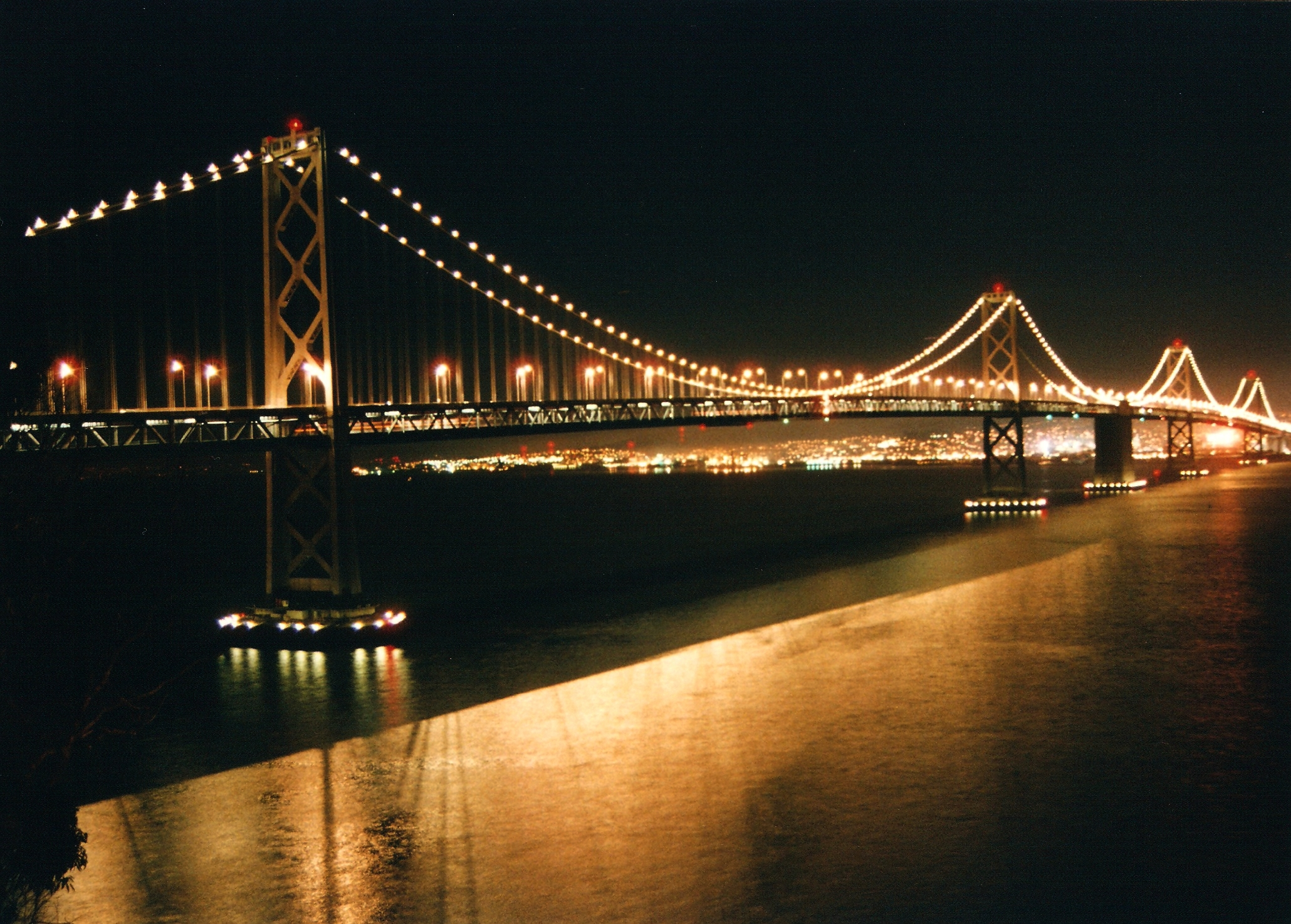
Bay Bridge by night in 1998.

Tolls are only collected from westbound traffic at the toll plaza on the Oakland side of the bridge. Those just traveling between Yerba Buena Island and the main part of San Francisco are not tolled. All-electronic tolling has been in effect since 2020, and drivers may either pay using the FasTrak electronic toll collection device or using the license plate tolling program. It remains not truly an open road tolling system until the remaining unused toll booths are removed, forcing drivers to slow substantially from freeway speeds while passing through. Effective January 1 – December 31, 2026, the toll rate for passenger cars is $8.50. During peak traffic hours on weekdays between 5:00 am and 10:00 am, and between 3:00 pm and 7:00 pm, carpool vehicles carrying three or more people or motorcycles may pay a discounted toll of $4.25 if they use the designated carpool lane with a FasTrak transponder, either the standard one or a Flex one with its switch set to indicate the number of the vehicle's occupants (1, 2, or 3+). Drivers without Fastrak or a license plate account must open and pay via a "short term" account within 48 hours after crossing the bridge or they will be sent an invoice of the unpaid toll. No additional toll violation penalty will be assessed if the invoice is paid within 21 days.

=== Historical toll rates ===
When the Bay Bridge opened in 1936, the toll was 65 cents (equivalent to $15.08 in 2025), collected in each direction by men in booths fronting each lane of traffic. Within months, the toll was lowered to 50 cents in order to compete with the ferry system, and finally to 25 cents since this was shown sufficient to pay off the original revenue bonds on schedule (equivalent to $11.2 and $5.6 in 2025 respectively). In 1951 there were eighty collectors working various shifts.

On Monday, September 1, 1969, (Labor Day) a change of policy resulted in the toll being collected thereafter only from westbound traffic, at twice the previous rate; eastbound vehicles were toll-exempt.

Tolls were subsequently raised to finance improvements to the bridge approaches, required to connect with new freeways, and to subsidize public transit in order to reduce the traffic over the bridge. The toll was increased by a quarter dollar to 75 cents in 1978 (equivalent to $3.70 in 2025), where it remained for a decade.

Caltrans, the state highway transportation agency, maintains seven of the eight San Francisco Bay Area bridges. (The Golden Gate Bridge is owned and maintained by the Golden Gate Bridge, Highway and Transportation District.)

The basic toll (for automobiles) on the seven state-owned bridges, including the San Francisco–Oakland Bay Bridge, was standardized to $1 by Regional Measure 1, approved by Bay Area voters in 1988 (equivalent to $2.72 in 2025). A $1 seismic retrofit surcharge was added in 1998 by the state legislature, increasing the toll to $2 (equivalent to $3.95 in 2025), originally for eight years, but since then extended to December 2037 (AB1171, October 2001). On March 2, 2004, voters approved Regional Measure 2 to fund various transportation improvement projects, raising the toll by another dollar to $3 (equivalent to $5.11 in 2025). An additional dollar was added to the toll starting January 1, 2007, to cover cost overruns on the eastern span replacement of the Bay Bridge, increasing the toll to $4 (equivalent to $6.21 in 2025).

The Metropolitan Transportation Commission (MTC), a regional transportation agency, in its capacity as the Bay Area Toll Authority, administers RM1 and RM2 funds, a significant portion of which are allocated to public transit capital improvements and operating subsidies in the transportation corridors served by the bridges. Caltrans administers the "second dollar" seismic surcharge, and receives some of the MTC-administered funds to perform other maintenance work on the bridges. The state legislature created the Bay Area Toll Authority in 1997 to transfer the toll administration of the seven state-owned bridges to the MTC. The Bay Area Toll Authority is made up of appointed officials put in place by various city and county governments, and is not subject to direct voter oversight.

Due to further funding shortages for seismic retrofit projects, the Bay Area Toll Authority again raised tolls on all seven of the state-owned bridges (this excludes the Golden Gate Bridge) in July 2010. The toll rate for autos on other Bay Area bridges was increased to $5 (equivalent to $7.38 in 2025), but in the Bay Bridge a congestion pricing tolling scheme was implemented. This variable pricing system was not truly congestion priced because toll rates came from a preset schedule and are not based on actual congestion. A $6 toll (equivalent to $8.86 in 2025) was charged from 5 a.m. to 10 a.m. and 3 p.m. to 7 p.m., Monday through Friday. During weekends cars paid the standard $5 toll like the other bridges. Carpools before the implementation were exempted but began to pay $2.50 (equivalent to $3.69 in 2025), and the carpool toll discount became available only to drivers with FasTrak electronic toll devices. The toll remained at the previous toll of $4 at all other times on weekdays (now equivalent to $5.91 in 2025). The Bay Area Toll Authority reported that by October 2010 fewer users are driving during the peak hours and more vehicles are crossing the Bay Bridge before and after the 5–10 a.m. period in which the congestion toll goes into effect. Commute delays in the first six months dropped by an average of 15% compared with 2009. For vehicles with at least 3 axles, the toll rate was $5 per axle.

In June 2018, Bay Area voters approved Regional Measure 3 to further raise the tolls on all seven of the state-owned bridges to fund $4.5 billion worth of transportation improvements in the area. Under the passed measure, the tolls on the Bay Bridge were raised by $1 on January 1, 2019, then again on January 1, 2022, and again on January 1, 2025. Thus under the congestion pricing scheme, the tolls for autos during the peak weekday rush hours were set to $7 in 2019, $8 in 2022, and $9 in 2025; for the non-rush periods, $5 in 2019, $6 in 2022, and $7 in 2025; and on weekends, $6 in 2019, $7 in 2022, and $8 in 2025. Congestion pricing was then suspended indefinitely in April 2020 due to the COVID-19 pandemic, leaving the weekend toll rates in effect for all days and times.

In September 2019, the MTC approved a $4 million plan to eliminate toll takers and convert all seven of the state-owned bridges to all-electronic tolling, citing that 80 percent of drivers are now using Fastrak and the change would improve traffic flow. On March 20, 2020, accelerated by the COVID-19 pandemic, all-electronic tolling was placed in effect for all seven state-owned toll bridges. The MTC then installed new systems at all seven bridges to make them permanently cashless by the start of 2021. In April 2022, the Bay Area Toll Authority announced plans to remove all remaining unused toll booths and create an open-road tolling system which functions at highway speeds; until then, drivers must still slow substantially while passing through the toll plaza.

The Bay Area Toll Authority then approved a plan in December 2024 to implement 50-cent annual toll increases on all seven state-owned bridges between 2026 and 2030 to help pay for bridge maintenance. The standard toll rate for autos will thus rise to $8.50 on January 1, 2026; $9 in 2027; $9.50 in 2028; $10 in 2029; and then to $10.50 in 2030. And becoming effective in 2027, a 25-cent surcharge will be added to any toll charged to a license plate account, and a 50-cent surcharge added to a toll violation invoice, due to the added cost of processing these payment methods.

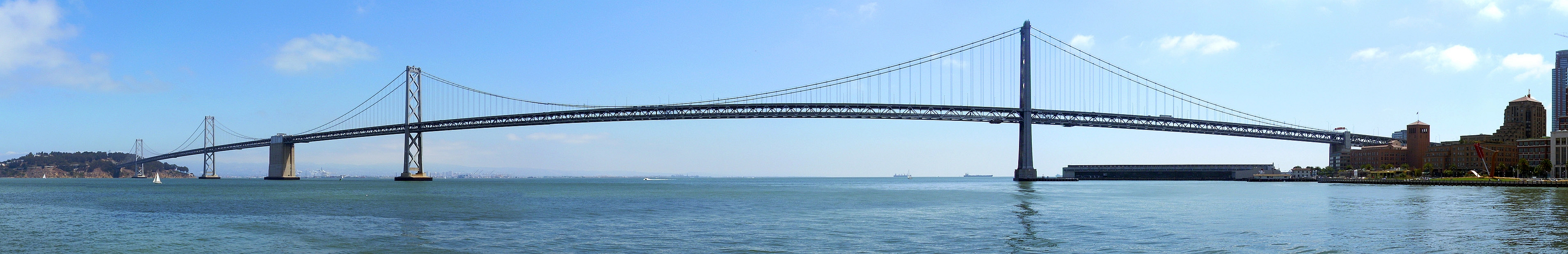
Panorama showing the western span, 2007
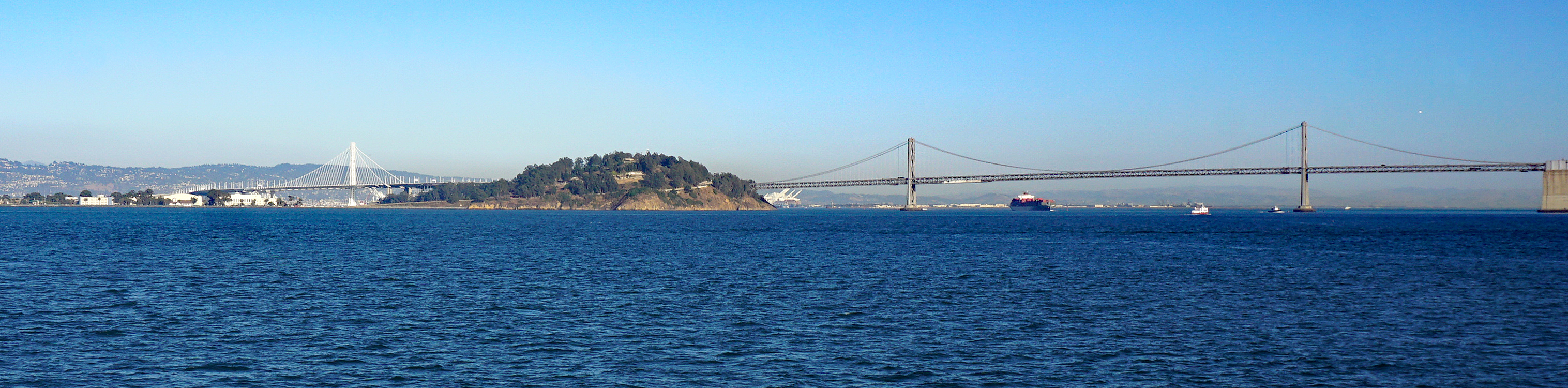
Panorama showing the Bay Bridge with the new eastern span, 2017

== See also ==
- 49-Mile Scenic Drive
- Bay Bridge Troll
- Cosco Busan oil spill
- Golden Gate Bridge
- List of bridges documented by the Historic American Engineering Record in California
- Southern Crossing (California), a proposed parallel bridge
- Treasure Island Development
- 25 de Abril Bridge, a bridge with a similar design in Portugal
