= Robert Halligan =

American engineer and information officer

Robert W. Halligan
- Born: 1926; Albion, Nebraska, U.S.
- Died: February 15, 1999 (aged 72–73); San Rafael, California, U.S.
- Occupations: Engineer, information officer
- Known for: Robin Williams Tunnel
- Children: 4

Robert W. Halligan (1926 – February 15, 1999) was an American engineer and information officer of the California Department of Transportation. During his 45-year career there, he helped State Route 24, and convinced Caltrans to celebrate the 50th anniversary of the Bay Bridge by stringing lights on the cables of the suspension spans – a temporary change which later became permanent. He was also responsible for Caltrans painting rainbows on the south portals of the Waldo Tunnel.

Halligan was known for his enthusiasm and showmanship: Known as a "walking museum of transportation lore", he moved from engineering to public affairs in the 1960s, where he arranged to have airplanes land on new freeways, orchestrated parades of covered wagons, and even antique car caravans, and high school bands. He was responsible for highway 280's designation as "The world's most beautiful freeway".

== Bay Bridge cable lighting ==
The series of lights adorning the westbound spans suspension cables were added in 1986, as part of the bridge's 50th-anniversary celebration. The lighting, which was intended to be temporary, was later made permanent.

== Robin Williams Tunnel ==
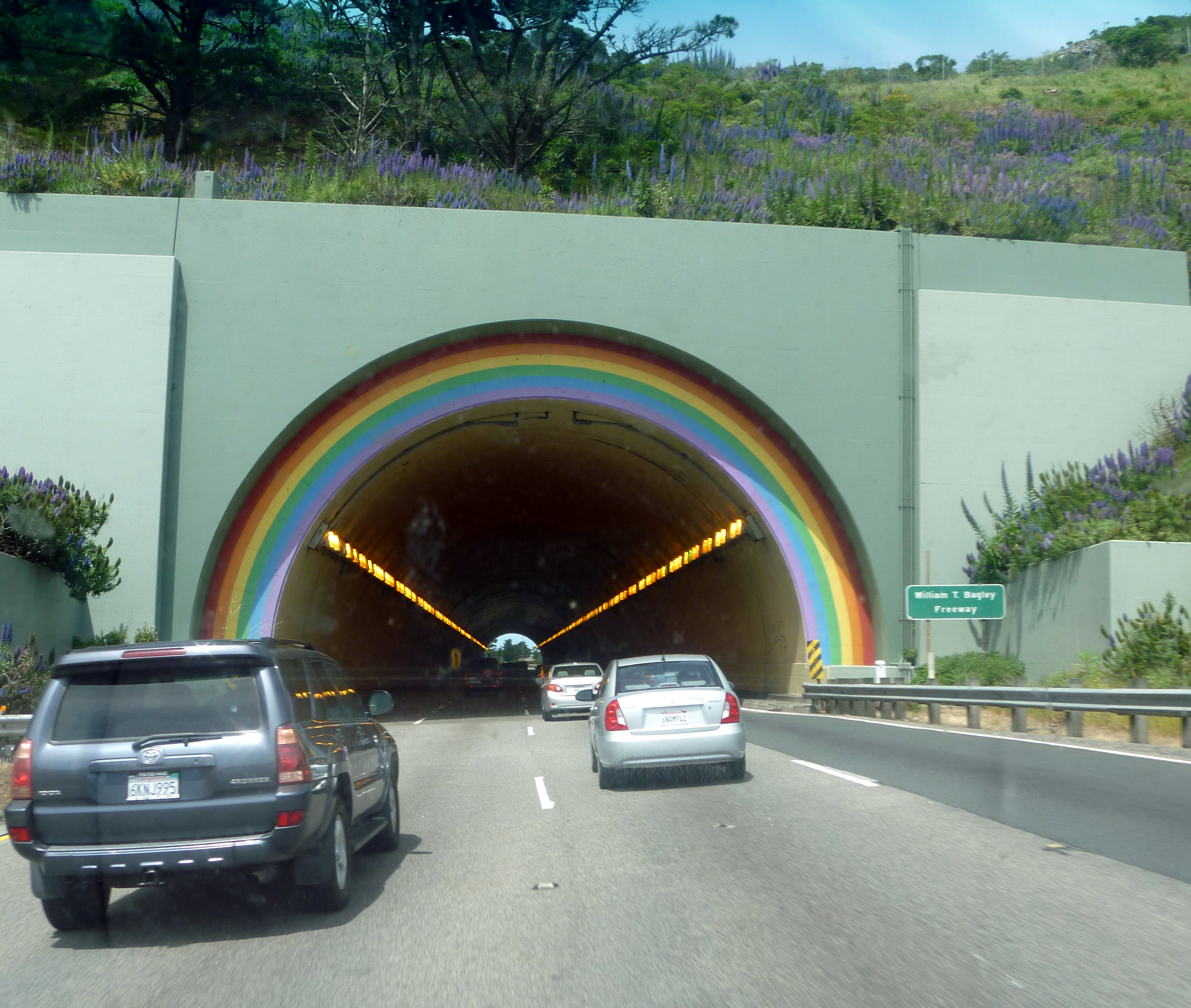
The Robin Williams Tunnel, southern portal

Halligan is most remembered for convincing the agency to paint rainbows on the portals of the Waldo Tunnel (now known as the "Robin Williams Tunnel"), on Highway 101 between Mill Valley and the Golden Gate Bridge, since he thought it would be nicer to welcome commuters driving back to the North Bay at the end of the day, when the highway planners were spending a lot of time thinking about the aesthetics and design of the roads in the 1960s and 70s.
