= Waldo Grade =

Highway grade between the Golden Gate Bridge and Marin City, California

The Waldo Grade is a highway grade between the Golden Gate Bridge and Marin City along U.S. Route 101 and State Route 1. It is defined as the stretch of roadway between the Spencer Offramp and Marin City, within the city of Sausalito. This grade is traversed by a full freeway multi-lane highway facility. This portion of US 101/SR 1 is an important link in surface transportation connecting the city of San Francisco to Marin County and the North Bay. Nearby locations to the Waldo Grade include: the city of Sausalito, the U.S. Army Corps of Engineers Bay Model, The Marine Mammal Center and the Golden Gate National Recreation Area. It, and nearby Waldo Point along Richardson Bay between Sausalito and Mill Valley, is named after 1850s California politician William Waldo.

== Robin Williams Tunnel ==
Robin Williams Tunnel
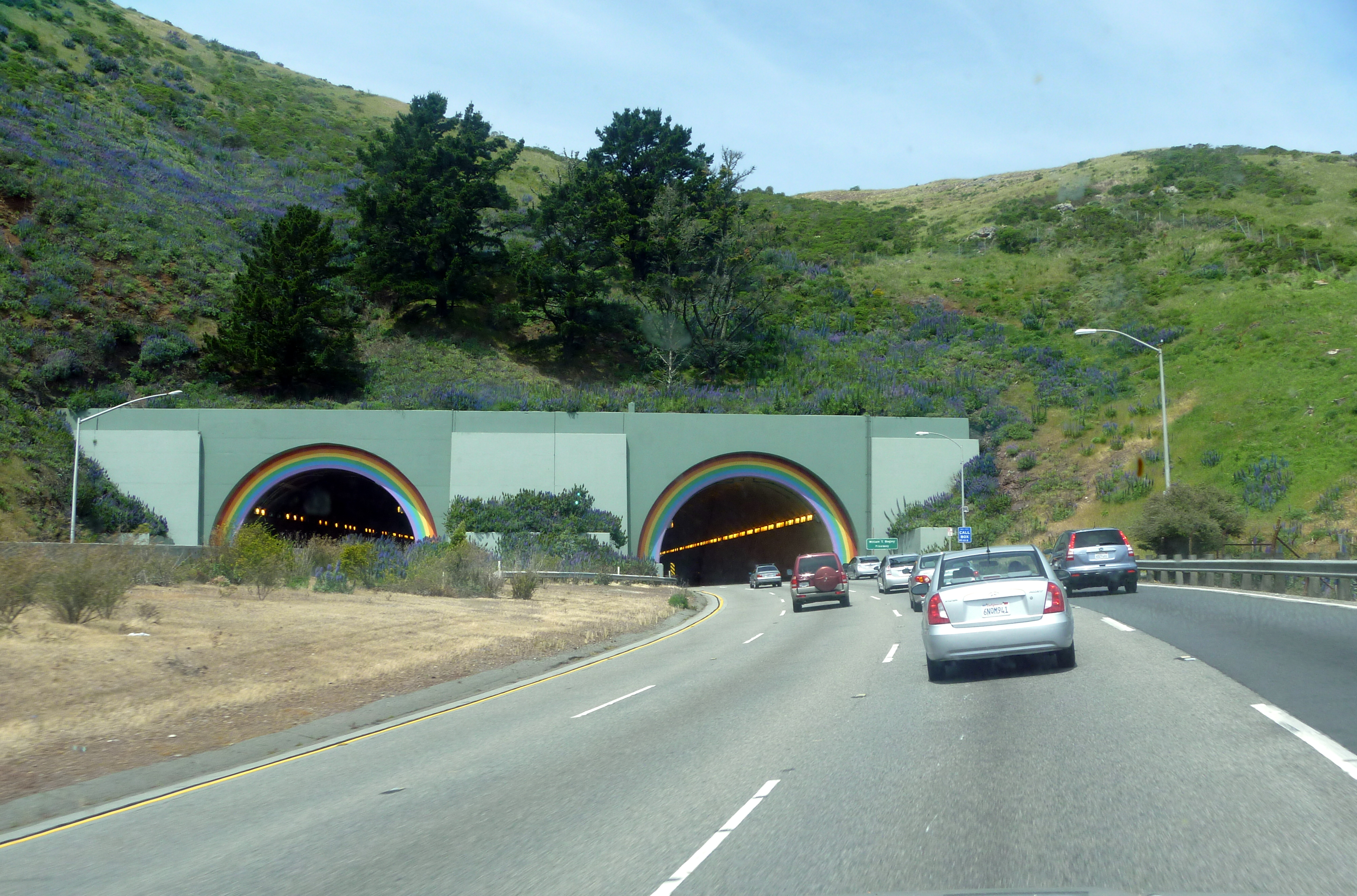
- The southern portal of the Robin Williams Tunnel

Overview
- Other name: Waldo Tunnel
- Location: Sausalito, California, US
- Coordinates: 37°50′34.86″N 122°29′08.34″W
- Route: US 101 / SR 1

Operation
- Opened: Bore 1 (west): 1937; Bore 2 (east): 1954
- Operator: Caltrans

Technical
- No. of lanes: 4 per bore

The Robin Williams Tunnel (originally the Waldo Tunnel) is located at the highest elevation on US 101/SR 1 along the Waldo Grade. The first bore of the tunnel was completed in 1937 and the second in 1954, with the Waldo Sidehill Viaducts. The archways at the south-facing ends of the bores were painted in rainbows after the lobbying by a Caltrans employee, Robert Halligan, and for this reason the tunnel is sometimes unofficially referred to as the Rainbow Tunnel.

After the death of actor and comedian Robin Williams in 2014, a petition was started on change.org to rename the Waldo Tunnel as the Robin Williams Tunnel, to commemorate Williams, a longtime resident of Marin County. A bill submitted by California Assemblyman Marc Levine after consulting with Williams' family passed the California State Assembly in April 2015 on a vote of 77–0, and the State Senate in June 2015 on a vote of 37–0. The official sign was installed in 2016.

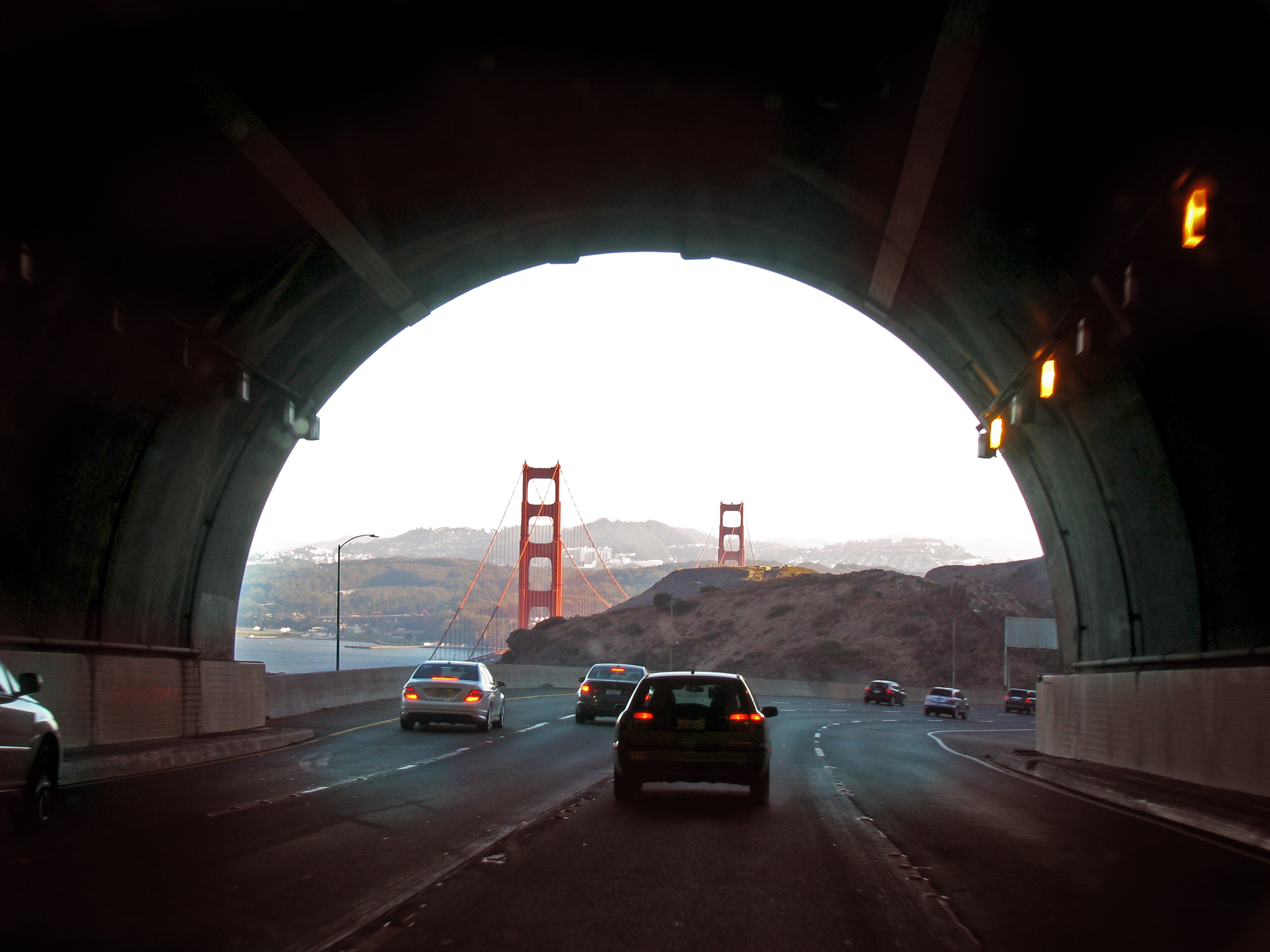
View of Golden Gate Bridge for southbound traffic on Redwood Highway at the southern portal of the Robin Williams Tunnel (2014)

As San Francisco and the Golden Gate Bridge are hidden from the northern approach of US 101/SR 1 by hills, automobile travelers heading south along this route get their first views of the city and its iconic bridge upon exiting the tunnel's southbound bore.

== 1982 landslides ==
On January 4–5, 1982, the freeway was completely closed for 24 hours as a result of two landslides on the Waldo Grade caused by a severe storm in the San Francisco Bay area, and partially closed for nearly two weeks.

The first landslide was on January 4, with rock, mud and trees falling onto the highway blocking the southbound lanes and two of the northbound lanes.

A second debris avalanche began about 50 feet (15 m) below the freeway at about 9:35pm on January 5, in fill material that had been stable since highway construction in 1953. The slide first carried away a house on Sausalito Boulevard, and then destroyed a house below it at 85 Crescent Avenue, killing resident Sally Baum. Three hundred residents were evacuated to a Red Cross shelter.

A crack developed in the roadway and, concerned that the highway might fail, Caltrans engineers closed all northbound lanes for twelve days while the road was reinforced with vertical pilings. The closure cut Marin County off from the San Francisco Peninsula. Thousands of Marin County residents were stranded in San Francisco who could not figure out how to get to Marin by using the Richmond-San Rafael Bridge (then-signed as SR 17 and later as I-580) or the bus lines that serve Marin from the East Bay. Some of the earth from the landslide was later transported to Mill Valley to create a building pad for the Shelter Point office complex.

== In fiction ==
The tunnel is featured in the Clint Eastwood film Dirty Harry and the Humphrey Bogart film Dark Passage. The honking of horns in the tunnel, often done deliberately for the sake of hearing the echoes, was the inspiration for harmonicist Bruce "Creeper" Kurnow's composition "Honk If You Love Harmonica."

In the film Bicentennial Man (starring Robin Williams), a futuristic view of a relocated highway bypasses the historic Waldo Grade.

At the beginning of the 2015 Pixar film Inside Out, the main character's family moves from Minnesota to San Francisco. Their first view of the Golden Gate Bridge - and the film's title card - appear as they emerge from the Robin Williams Tunnel.

== See also ==
- Richardson Bay
