= Yaquina =

Yaquina is a place-name native to the U.S. state of Oregon.

Yaquina may refer to:

- Yaquina people, a Native American tribe from Oregon
- Yaquina Bay
- Yaquina Bay Bridge
- Yaquina Bay Light
- Yaquina Bay State Recreation Site
- Yaquina Head
- Yaquina Head Light
- Yaquina River
- Yaquina, Oregon, an unincorporated area on the Yaquina Bay
- USAV Yaquina, a hopper dredge ship of the U.S. Army Corps of engineers
