= Yaqui (disambiguation) =

Yaqui typically refers to the Yaqui people.

It can also refer to:

== People ==
- Pascua Yaqui Tribe, a federally recognized tribe of Yaqui people in Arizona
- Texas Band of Yaqui Indians, a nonprofit organization in Texas
- Yaqui López (b. 1951), Mexican boxer

== Culture ==
- Yaqui language
- Yaqui music

== Places ==
- Yaqui River in Sonora, Mexico

== Other ==
- Yaqui Uprising, 1896 conflict to secure the independence of the Yaqui tribe
- Yaqui Wars, ongoing conflicts with New Spain/Mexico with Yaqui Indians
- Yaquis de Obregón, a Mexican baseball team

== See also ==
- Yaquina (disambiguation)
