= Blossom Rock (San Francisco Bay) =

Rock in San Francisco Bay, San Francisco County, California, United States

Coordinates: 37.8194°N 122.4019°W

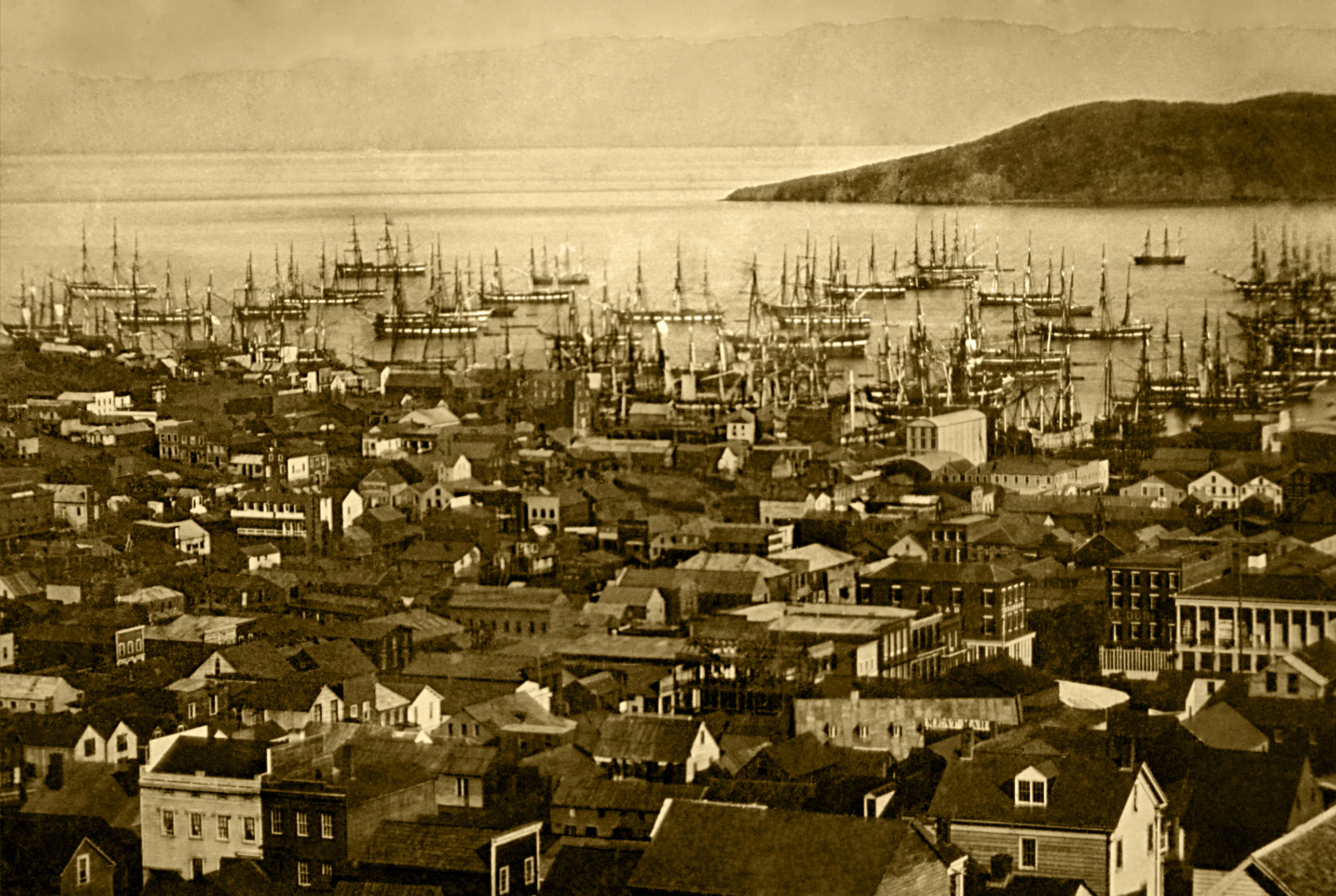
San Francisco harbor, 1851. Yerba Buena Island is offshore. Blossom Rock is underwater to left of island. East shore location of "Navigation Trees" is in distant background, obscured by fog.

Blossom Rock was a serious navigational hazard to sailing ships entering or leaving San Francisco Bay in the 19th century. It was formally reported by Captain F. Beechey of the Royal Navy ship HMS Blossom in 1827.

The rock, named in honor of Beechey's ship, was located about halfway between Alcatraz Island and Yerba Buena Island, and about 1,000 yards (0.91 km) off the Port of San Francisco. It was normally submerged about 5 feet (1.5 m) below mean low tide, so would not have been visible to the ship's captain or crew. Captain Beechey explained how sailors could avoid striking the rock by using two particularly prominent giant redwood trees atop the ridgeline of the hills east of the Bay to determine the exact location of their ships with respect to the rock. (Note: These specific trees, thereafter called the "Navigation Trees," were later determined to be in what is now known as the Madrone Picnic Area of the Roberts Regional Recreation Area.)

After the "Navigation Trees" were cut down in the early 1850s, sailors no longer had an easy way to identify the location of Blossom Rock. There were repeated attempts to mark it with buoys, but those were swept away by the strong currents of the bay. In 1870, a group of US military engineers, led by Robert S. Williamson, developed a procedure to remove enough of the rock to eliminate it as a navigational hazard.

== Discovery of the Rock ==
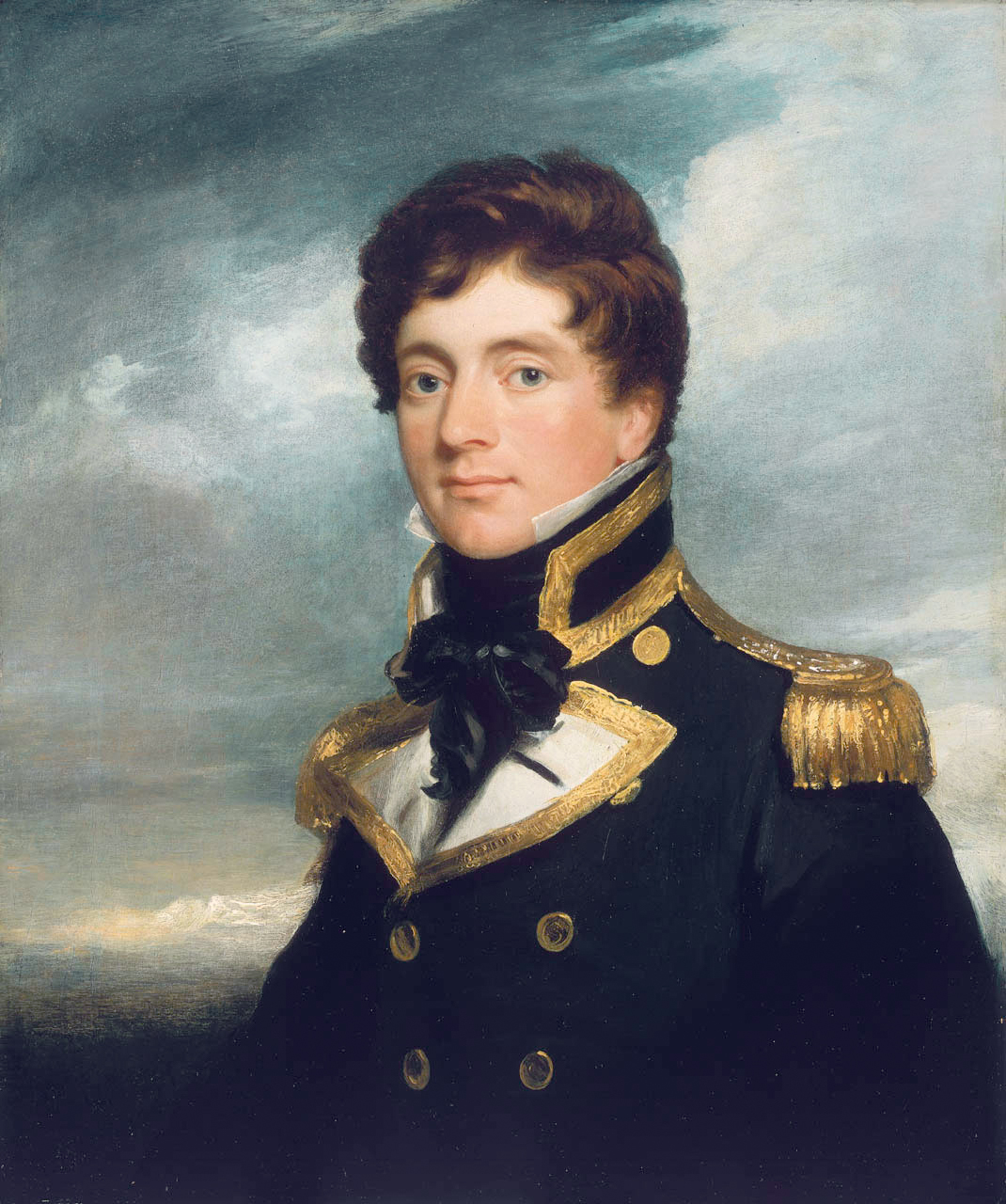
Frederick William Beechey, RN, Discoverer of Blossom Rock. Portrait ca. 1822

In 1827, Royal Navy Captain Frederick William Beechey (1796–1856) of HMS Blossom was exploring the channel in San Francisco Bay between the Golden Gate and the Port of San Francisco, California, when he discovered an uncharted obstacle at a point about halfway between Alcatraz Island and Yerba Buena Island, and about 1,000 yards (0.91 km) off the Port of San Francisco. He determined that the obstacle was a very large rock, which was too massive to remove with the available technologies. He named the submerged object "Blossom Rock".

During the 1700s, when Europeans first came to the Oakland Hills area, the eastern coast of San Francisco Bay contained huge forests of old growth giant redwood trees, extending inland from the hills to areas now known as Moraga and Lafayette, California. These original trees were still present during the early 1840s.

== "Navigation Trees" ==
Captain Beechy observed two trees on the hills that were even more prominent than their neighbors, and that sailors could use as reference points to locate the submerged Blossom Rock. Thereafter, the two trees were known as the "navigation trees", because they helped ships avoid the rock. (Note: The two navigation trees were later determined to have been located at what is now called the "Madrone Picnic Area" in Roberts Regional Recreation Park.) This location is marked by California Historical Landmark #962, "Blossom Rock Navigation Trees".

Widespread logging of the old growth forest began about 1840, and by 1860 practically none of the old redwoods remained visible from the bay. (Note: Only stumps of the original trees remain. In 1893, William P. Gibbons found a stump that measured 32 feet (9.8 m) in diameter (excluding the bark).) The Navigation Trees were reportedly cut down after 1851 and before 1854, (Note: The trees were still used by navigators in 1851, but had disappeared from the horizon by 1854; visitors to the site in 1854 found a stump that had new growth sprouting from it.) eliminating this means of warning ships about the location of Blossom Rock. The American navy tried several times to place buoys around the rock, but each time, rough seas in the bay swept away the buoys. Loss of the redwood trees created such a navigational problem that the Corps of Engineers was tasked to remove the obstacle.

In 1984, the site of the navigation trees was named a historical landmark by the state of California. A plaque marks the location and there are trees currently growing in the area that are sprouts from the original trees' stumps.

== Rock removal ==
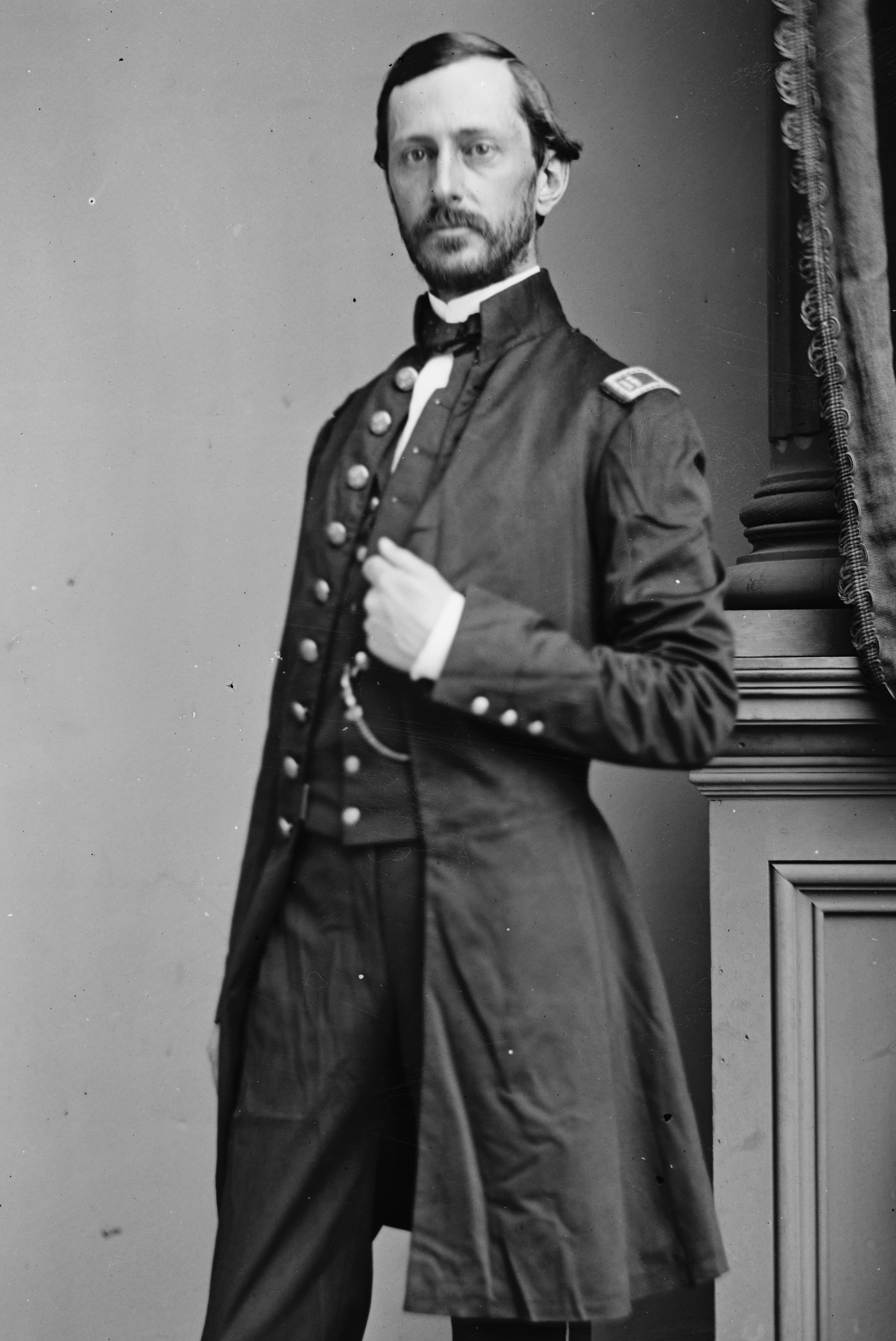
Captain R.S. Williamson, U.S. Army Corps of Engineers led initial stages of Blossom Rock removal (photo c. 1860-1863).

=== Initial attempts to blast the rocks ===
In December 1866 Col. Robert Williamson of the U.S. Army Corps of Engineers decided to blast the rock down to a safe level. He requested U.S. Coast Survey assistant Edward Cordell to make surveys before and after each blast. The superintendent of the U.S. Coast Survey, Erasmus Hilgard, gave Cordell permission, so long as it didn't interfere with his other work. That was no problem, since the floodwaters in the Sacramento and San Joaquin Rivers were too high to carry out surveys there at the time.

On 14 January 1867, Cordell moved his survey schooner Marcy and crew from their usual stand at Meig's Wharf to anchorage off Blossom Rock, and began sounding the area using the small boat. Apparently they were finished before the blasters were ready, since on Jan. 17 he resumed observations of the currents in San Francisco Bay, following the drifting floats in the small boat.

By 30 January 1867 all was ready, and at 9:00 AM the first blast was set off. It made no discernable difference in the depths. A second blast was set off the next morning, with the same result. All during February they set off blasts, waited while Cordell's crew measured the depths, then set off the next. After the 6th and 7th blasts on Feb. 26, Cordell gave up and returned to Meig's Wharf. There had been no change in the depth of the water over the rock.

However, at Williamson's request, Cordell continued work on Blossom rock. Another blast took place on 4 March 1867, one on 5 March, two on 6 March, and the last on 7 March 1867. Altogether they had blasted it a dozen times. The results were not spectacular, and since their charges were exhausted, they replaced the buoy and abandoned the effort.

=== Renewed work ===
Major R.S. Williamson and Lieutenant W.H. Heuer were put in charge of the Blossom Rock removal project in 1870. Their first task was to make accurate measurements of the rock, which no one had yet been able to do, then to perform experiments to determine the weight of explosive needed to accomplish the goal. They wrote that the top was 5 feet (1.5 m) below water at mean low tide. At a depth of 24 feet (7.3 m), the rock's length was 125 feet (38 m) and its width was 105 feet (32 m). The desired end was to clear the channel to a depth of 24 feet (7.3 m) below mean low tide.

=== Surface blasting experiments ===
The removal team prepared three charges of gunpowder, weighing 75, 125, and 175 pounds, respectively. They sealed each charge in a water-tight wooden cask that had a hole bored in its top for passing the wire that would detonate a cartridge, which had been placed as close to the center of the charge as possible. Each cask was then wrapped in a tight-fitting sack of sailcloth, and covered with tar. Two pieces of iron would be tied to each cask (one on each side of the cask) to prevent the tide from washing the assembly off the rock.

The first blasting experiment occurred on 29 January 1870. A 75-pound charge was exploded when the rock was covered by 16 feet (4.9 m) of water. The rock was "shattered", but no large pieces were broken off.

The second experiment was performed on the next day, using a 175-pound gunpowder charge under 11 feet (3.4 m) of water. After the blast, there was no noticeable increase in water depth (which would have occurred if a significant chunk of rock had been blown off the top). This time, a diver was sent down to make a close-up inspection ("... in armor"). (Note: The authors' term "armor" undoubtedly referred to the use of a diving suit.) The diver found several breaks and jagged places in the rock, but no increase in water depth. The diver brought up several rock samples for further examination.

The third experiment was performed on 9 February 1870, using a 175-pound explosive charge under 14 feet (4.3 m) of water. The explosion threw a plume of water to a height of 40 feet (12 m) in the air. After-action inspection showed that about 11 cubic yards (8.4 m^{3}) had been removed from the original rock.

The fourth experiment, on 19 February 1870, employed two successive blasts, each using a 125-pound charge under 20 feet (6.1 m) of water. It removed 15 cubic yards (11 m^{3}) of material from Blossom Rock.

The fifth test, on 20 February 1870, used two 125 pound charges in successive explosions, one under 18 feet (5.5 m) and the other under 21 feet (6.4 m) of water, but removed only 3 cubic yards (2.3 m^{3}) of stone. The authors stated that they believed the charges had been placed on loose rock accumulated from previous tests, and did not cause as much damage as if they had been placed on a solid stone surface.

The sixth test, performed 4–5 March 1870, used two 75 pound charges under 21 feet (6.4 m) of water. The only comment was that very little damage was done to the rock.

The seventh test, performed 6 March 1870, used two 125 pound charges exploded in 16 feet (4.9 m) of water, removed 12 cubic yards (9.2 m^{3}) of stone.

The eighth test, performed 7 March 1870, exploded the remaining 175 pound charge under 13 feet (4.0 m) of water, removed 8.5 cubic yards (6.5 m^{3}) of stone. The authors noted that the blast threw up a column of water that was about 50 feet (15 m) high and about the same in diameter.

=== Conclusions and recommendations ===
- Williams and Heuer concluded that the largest charge was more effective at removing stone than the second largest. The lowest charge was essentially ineffective.
- The more water above the charge, the more effective the explosion was at removing stone.
- A cast iron container for the charge would have been more effective than the wooden cask.

The first two observations led the team to believe that it would be better to initially drill into the rock, then place the charge at the bottom of the hole before detonating.

== Outcome ==
Sometime after Williamson and his crew finished their work, what remained of Blossom Rock was further removed to a depth of 21 feet (6.4 m) below mean low tide. Evidently, a decision was made to remove more of the rock. The Chief Engineer of the U.S. Army reported in 1903 that Blossom Rock was further removed from 24 to 30 feet (9.1 m) in depth by 27 December 1903. (Note: The 1904 report says this work was part of a larger project approved by Congress in 1899.)

In 1974, the San Francisco office of the Corps of Engineers reported that Blossom Rock, as well as several other rock pinnacles in San Francisco Bay, had been removed to a depth of 40 feet (12 m) below mean low tide, as part of a project to widen and deepen the channel into the Port of San Francisco.

== See also ==
- Blossom Rock Navigation Trees (California Historical Landmark)
- Williamson, R.S.; Heuer, W.H. (1870). Report upon the Removal of Blossom Rock in San Francisco Harbor, California. Corps of Engineers (Report). U.S. Army – via Archive.org.
- Report upon the Removal of Blossom Rock in San Francisco Harbor, California. Corps of Engineers (Report). Report of the Chief of Engineers. U.S. Army. 1904 – via Google Books.
- Robert S. Williamson
