= Yerba Buena Light =

Lighthouse in the San Francisco Bay, California

Yerba Buena Light Goat Island
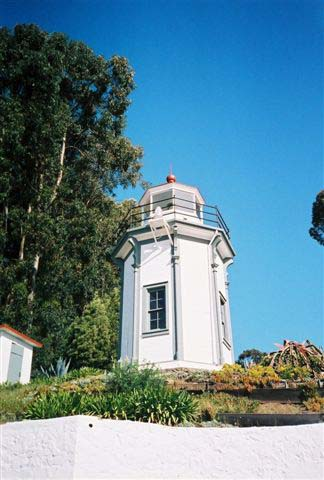
- Yerba Buena Lighthouse
- Location: Yerba Buena Island; San Francisco Bay; California; United States
- Coordinates: 37°48′26.27″N 122°21′44.29″W

Tower
- Constructed: 1875
- Foundation: masonry basement
- Construction: wooden tower
- Automated: 1958
- Height: 25 feet (7.6 m)
- Shape: octagonal tower with balcony and lantern
- Operator: United States Coast Guard
- Heritage: National Register of Historic Places listed place

Light
- Focal height: 95 feet (29 m)
- Lens: Fifth order Fresnel lens
- Range: 14 nmi (26 km; 16 mi)
- Characteristic: Oc. W 4s.
- Yerba Buena Island Lighthouse
- U.S. National Register of Historic Places
- U.S. Historic district
- Nearest city: San Francisco, California
- Area: 2.7 acres (1.1 ha)
- Architectural style: Late Gothic Revival, Stick/Eastlake, Lighthouse
- MPS: Light Stations of California MPS
- NRHP reference No.: 91001096
- Added to NRHP: September 03, 1991

Yerba Buena Lighthouse is a lighthouse in California, United States, in the San Francisco Bay on Yerba Buena Island, California

== History ==
The island's lighthouse connection began in 1873 when the Lighthouse Service moved the district's depot from Mare Island to the southeast side of Yerba Buena Island. In 1875 construction was completed on the 25-foot (7.6 m) tower with a fifth order Fresnel lens, brought from the recently decommissioned Yaquina Bay Light in Newport, Oregon. In 1886 another fifth order lens replaced the previous one. In 1933, a tunnel was bored through Yerba Buena Island to serve as a link between the east and west sections of the Oakland Bay Bridge. The light was automated by the United States Coast Guard in 1958. It is currently an active aid to navigation and not open to the public. Now that the lighthouse is automated, the former keeper's quarters are now the home of the Coast Guard Admiral.

== Head keepers ==
- N. D. Tuttle (1875 – 1877).
- Reinhold Holzhuter (1877 – 1880).
- John C. Linné (1881 – 1885).
- George B. Koons (1885 – 1888).
- John A. F. McFarland (1888 – 1892).
- Henry Hall (1892).
- John M. Nilsson (1892 – 1893).
- Richard A. Weiss (1893 – 1904).
- Herbert H. Luff (1904 – 1921).
- John P. Kofod (1921 – 1928).
- Albert N. Speelman (1928 – at least 1935).
- Lemuel C. Miner (at least 1940 – 1943).
- John J. Woyner (1943 – 1944).
- Wayne R. Piland ( – 1946).
- James C. Moore (1946 – 1947).
- Fred Zimmermann (n/a).
- Wayne R. Piland (1953 – 1958).

== Gallery ==
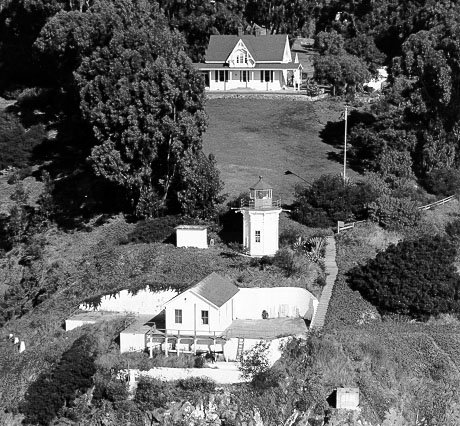

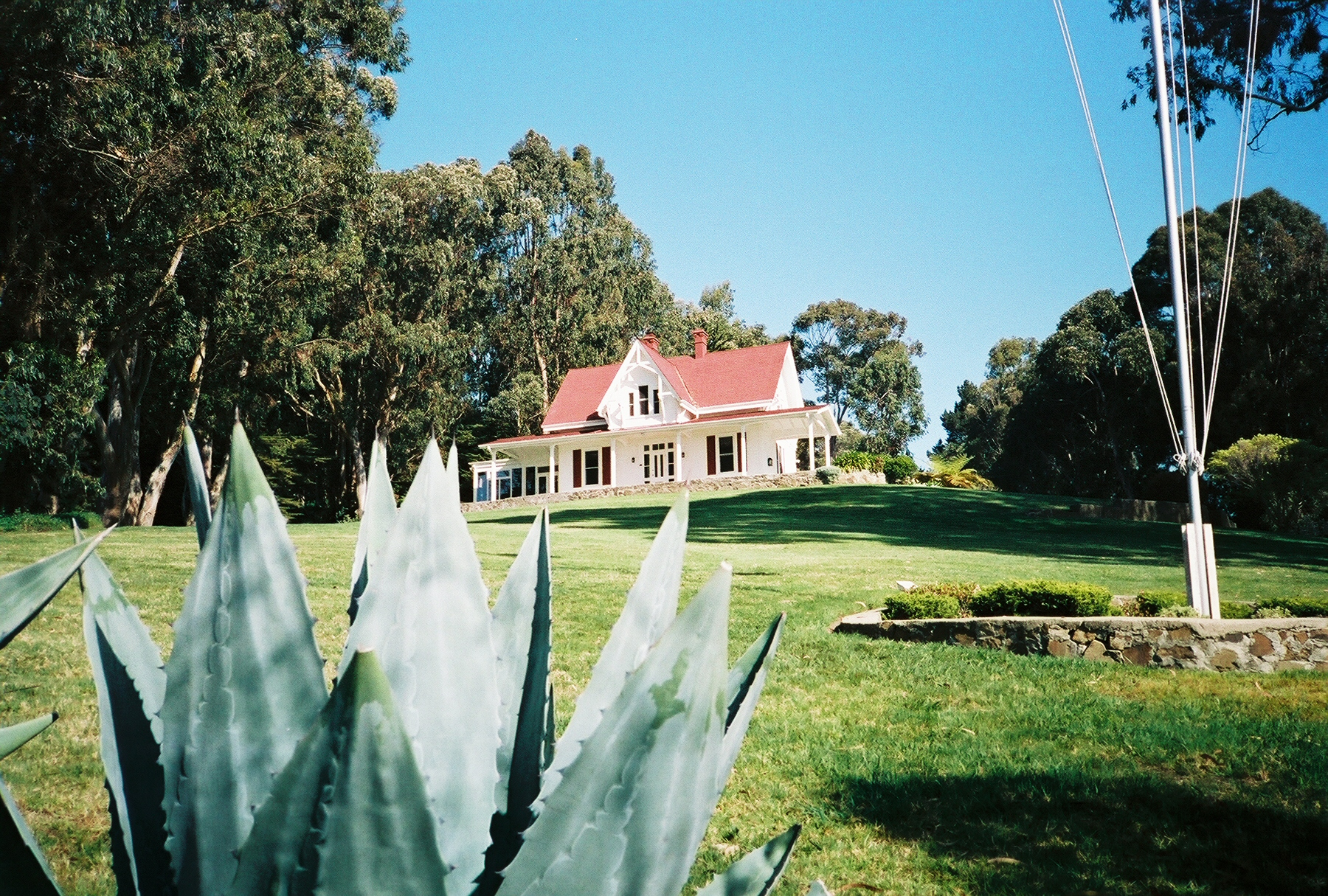

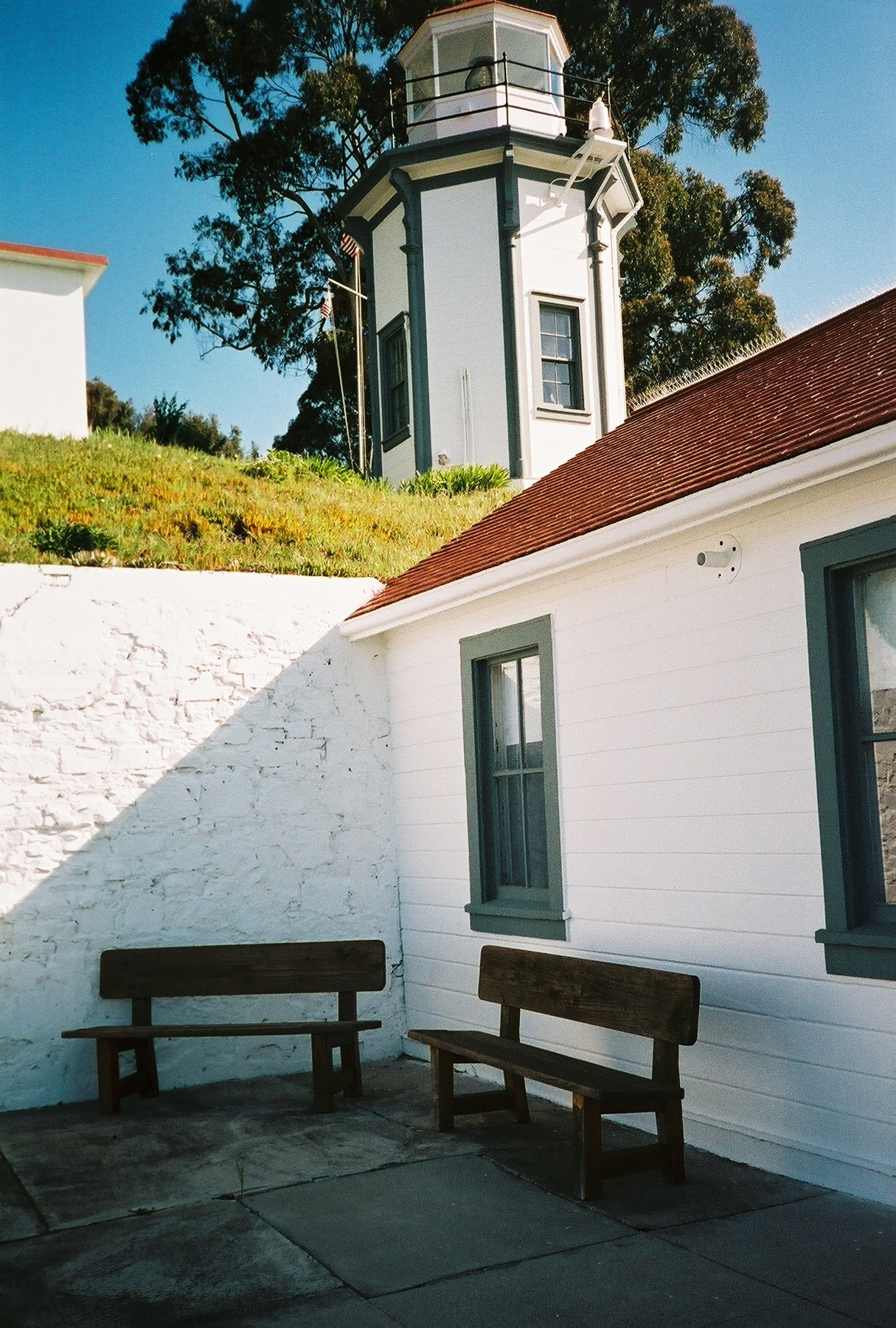

== See also ==
- List of lighthouses in the United States
