= Robert S. Williamson =

American soldier and engineer (1825-1882)

Robert Stockton Williamson
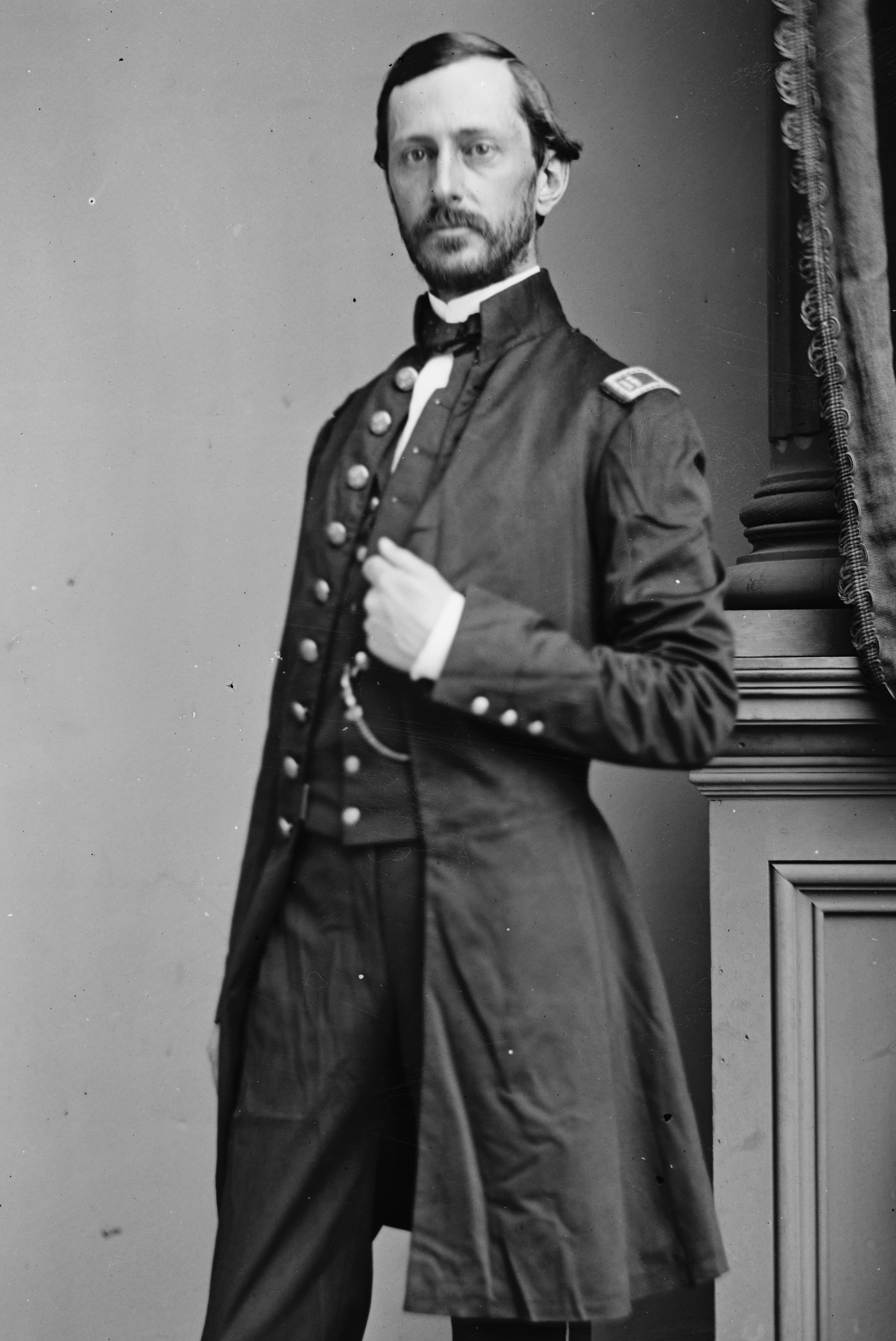
- Robert S. Williamson
- Born: January 21, 1825; Oxford, New York, US
- Died: November 10, 1882 (aged 57); San Francisco, California, US
- Burial place: San Francisco Masonic Cemetery
- Military career
- Allegiance: United States; Union
- Branch: United States Army; Union Army
- Service years: 1848–1882
- Rank: Lieutenant Colonel
- Unit: Corps of Engineers
- Conflicts: American Civil War: Battle of New Bern; Battle of Fort Macon

Robert Stockton Williamson (January 21, 1825 – November 10, 1882) was an American soldier and engineer, noted for conducting surveys in the 1850s of possible routes for the transcontinental railroad in California and Oregon. Inducted into the United States Army Corps of Engineers in 1861, he had a distinguished record serving in the American Civil War, winning two brevet promotions. When the United States Army Corps of Engineers established its San Francisco District office in 1866, he was appointed as the first commander of the office. Formally promoted to the rank of lieutenant colonel in 1869, he retired in 1871 at age 46, because of health problems, and died in San Francisco in 1882.

== Early life and career ==
Williamson was born in Oxford, New York and lived in Elizabeth, New Jersey. He was named after Commodore Robert F. Stockton, a family friend. He joined the Navy in 1843 as a master's mate under Stockton on the USS Princeton, the first screw-driven steam ship in the Navy. Williamson was detached from the ship 10 days before one of its guns exploded, killing several people.

It was through Stockton's influence that Williamson was appointed to the United States Military Academy. He graduated fifth in his class in 1848 and appointed a second lieutenant in the Corps of Topographical Engineers. He was assigned to conduct surveys for proposed routes for the transcontinental railroad in California and Oregon, leading surveys of the Sierra Nevada above the Feather River alongside William Horace Warner. In 1853, War Secretary Jefferson Davis chose Williamson to lead surveys of California's southern Sierra and mountains near Los Angeles for the Pacific Railroad. His work was published in volume 5 of the War Department's Reports of Explorations and Surveys. Williamson was then assigned to the staff of the commanding general of the Department of the Pacific, and was the engineer in charge of the military roads in southern Oregon.

== Civil War ==
After the outbreak of the American Civil War, Williamson was commissioned with the rank of Captain into the 1st Battalion of Engineers, and was the Chief Topographical Engineer in North Carolina. He was brevetted Major on March 14, 1862, for service at the Battle of New Bern, and brevetted a Lieutenant Colonel at the Battle of Fort Macon on April 26, 1862.

He was then assigned as Chief Topographical Engineer for the Army of the Potomac. Williamson returned to California as the Chief Topographical Engineer of the Department of the Pacific. He was formally promoted to the rank of Major on May 7, 1863. In 1863, Williamson transferred to the Corps of Engineers and served as lighthouse engineer for the Pacific Coast. He also worked on defenses and harbors along the coast.

== Postbellum ==
In 1866, Major Williamson was appointed Commander and Officer-in-Charge when the U. S. Army Corps of Engineers established its San Francisco District Office in 1866. This office was then mainly responsible for engineering related to rivers and harbors along the entire Pacific coast, from Canada to Mexico, and included Hawaii. (Note: The USACE San Francisco District office continues to operate as of 2017, though its geographic scope has been limited to the California coast from Big Sur to the Oregon border.) He remained in this position until 1871.

He was formally promoted to Lieutenant Colonel on February 2, 1869, just before submitting his survey on improvements to San Pedro Bay, California. This proposed construction of a jetty, the first federal harbor works at the site of the future Port of Los Angeles. The project would enhance shipping and also help entice the Southern Pacific Railroad to build to the harbor rather than to San Diego. He also served as a railroad commissioner, and he improved accessibility to San Francisco Bay by removal of Blossom Rock about 1870.

In 1870, he was elected as a member to the American Philosophical Society.

He retired from the Army as a lieutenant colonel in 1871 at age 46, due to illness. Williamson had suffered from bad health for the last 20 years of his life and died of tuberculosis in 1882 at San Francisco, California. He was buried at the Masonic Cemetery in San Francisco.

== Legacy ==
- In California, Mount Williamson is named for him.
- Williamson Mountain and the Williamson River in Oregon are named in his honor.
- A western North American woodpecker, the Williamson's sapsucker, and the mountain whitefish, Prosopium williamsoni, are named after him.
- Williamson Valley (Arizona) is named after him.
