= Roberts Regional Recreation Area =

Coordinates: 37°48′46.05″N 122°10′28.75″W

- Interactive map of Roberts Regional Recreation Area
- Type: Recreation
- Nearest city: Oakland, California
- Area: 82 acres (0.33 km^{2})
- Created: 1952
- Operator: East Bay Regional Park District

Roberts Regional Recreation Area (RRRA) is an area adjacent to Redwood Regional Park located in Alameda County next to Oakland, CA and is part of the East Bay Regional Parks (EBRPD). It is across Skyline Drive from the City of Oakland's Joaquin Miller Park. Kaiser Aluminum and Chemical Corp. adopted Roberts Park in 1979, under the newly-developed Adopt-a-Park program, which promised continued funding. This was the first park in EBRPD to be so adopted.

Roberts Regional Recreational Area has picnic tables, playground and a seasonal pool with lifeguard.

== History ==
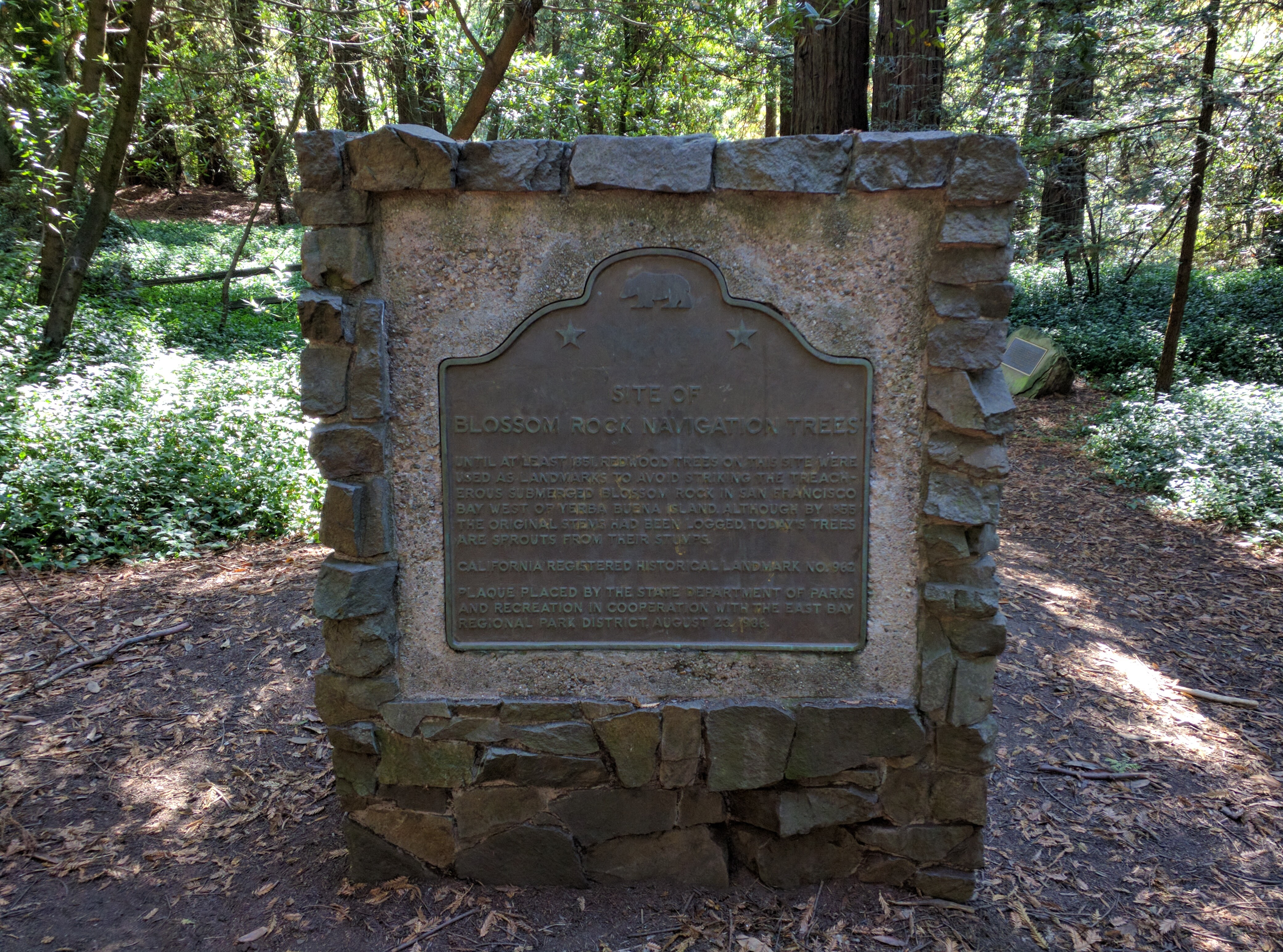
California Registered Historical Landmark No. 962. Plaque placed in Roberts Regional Recreation Area August 23, 1986. Photo courtesy of Jasper Jurcenoaks. September 10, 2016.

California Historical Landmark #962, "Blossom Rock Navigation Trees," is located in the Madrone Picnic Area of the Roberts area. It describes how two of the most prominent redwood trees were used by sailors entering San Francisco Bay during the early 19th Century to avoid hitting a submerged hazard known as Blossom Rock. (Note: Blossom Rock received its name after it was discovered by F. W. Beechey of HMS Blossom.) The rock was between Alcatraz Island, Yerba Buena Island and the Port of San Francisco.

The rock was first reported in 1827 by a British sea captain. (Note: It was impractical to remove the rock because underwater demolition was not sufficiently developed at the time.) It was finally rendered non-hazardous in 1870 by the Corps of Engineers, using a combination of drilling and blasting. Meanwhile, the "Navigation Trees" were cut down between 1851 and 1855, leaving ships entering and leaving the Golden Gate for nearly two more decades.

The RRRA area was covered by redwood trees that were logged between 1840 and 1860 to provide building materials needed to support the explosive population growth in San Francisco and Oakland immediately following the discovery of gold in California. Redwood trees presently in Roberts and Redwood parks are second growth.

Roberts Regional Recreational Area opened to the public in 1952. It was named for Thomas J. "Tommy" Roberts, then secretary to the East Bay Regional Park District board of directors for 24 years. He continued to serve on the board until his death in 1958, at age 95.

== Activities ==
The RRRA opens at 8:00 AM, year round. Closing time varies from 5:00 PM to 8:00 PM, depending on the month. The park may close earlier than the posted time if the weather turns bad or if there are judged to be too few visitors. Parking fees are $5.00 per vehicle, $4.00 per trailer, and $25.00 per bus.

Dogs on the inside of RRRA must be leashed. There is no charge for guide/service dogs. Owners are charged $2.00 for all other dogs.

=== Picnicking ===
There are eight reservable picnic locations in the main part of the park (capacities are shown in parentheses):

- Bay Vista (100)
- Manzanita (150) Schools and Camps Only
- Diablo Vista (150) Schools and Camps Only
- Huckleberry (75)
- Sycamore (50)
- Madrone (50)
- Oak (35)
- Roberts Grove (35)

Two additional sites in the Redwood Bowl area are suitable for larger groups:

- Redwood Bowl (50)
- Anna Costa (50)

All picnic sites have serving tables, individual picnic tables, cooking areas, barbecue pits and drinking fountains. Reservations can be made by calling 1-888-EBPARKS or 1-888-327-2757, press option 2. Reservations are not necessary for family picnicking when there are fewer than 25 people in the group.

=== Swimming ===
Roberts Pool, now renovated, spans about 5,600 square feet with depths ranging from 3 to 9 feet and is heated. It serves recreational use, swim lessons, and training. Upgrades include a new pool deck, retaining walls, landscaping, entry kiosk, fencing, gates, and ADA-compliant parking and access. The facility also features a public changing area with gender-neutral and fully accessible restrooms.

== See also ==
- HMS Blossom (1806)
- Blossom Rock Navigation Trees (California Historical Landmark)
- Report Upon the Removal of Blossom Rock San Francisco Harbor, California. Williamson, R. S. and W. H. Heuer. 1870.
