= Yerba Buena Island =

Neighborhood of San Francisco, California, US

Yerba Buena Island Isla de Alcatraces
- Neighborhood of San Francisco
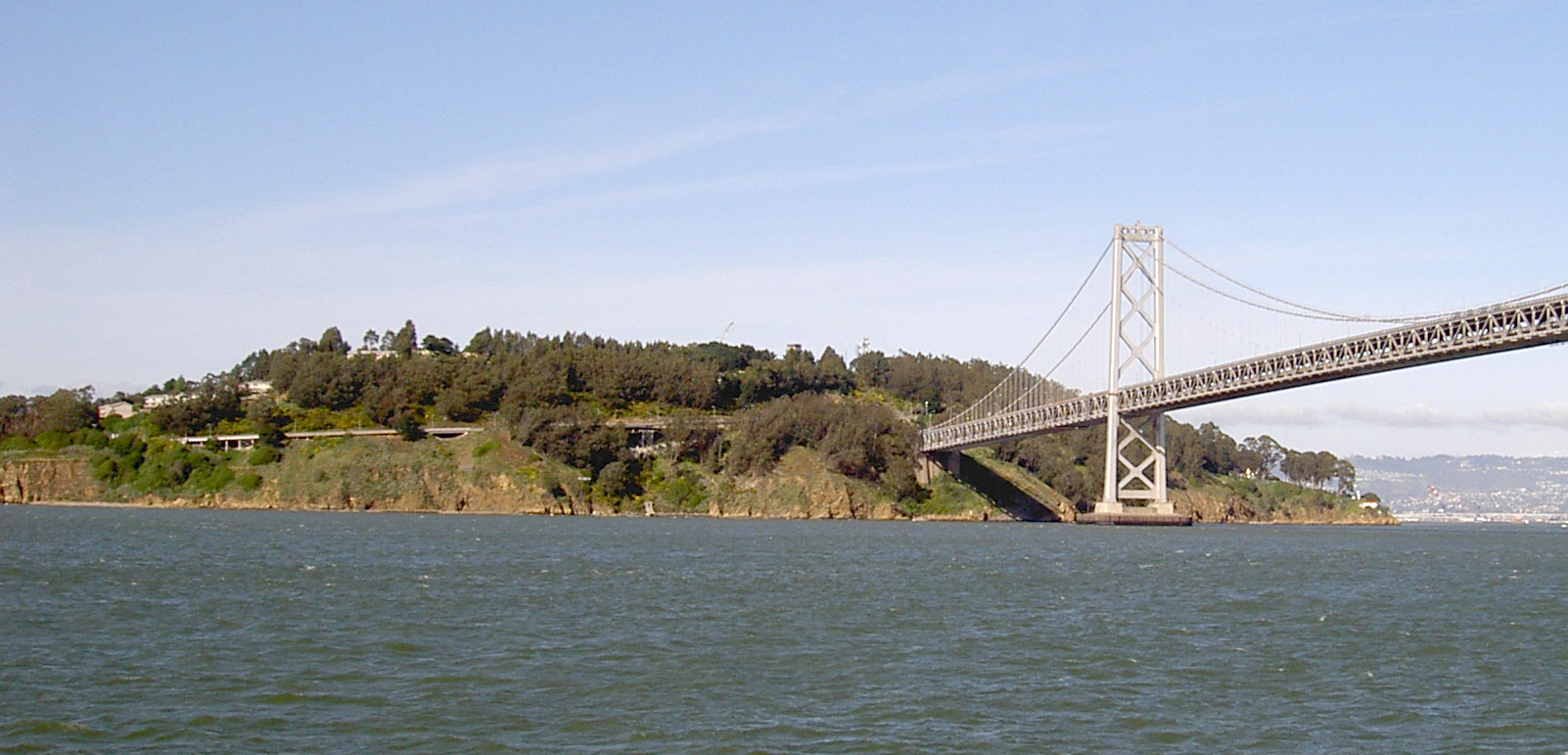
- Yerba Buena Island with the San Francisco–Oakland Bay Bridge in the foreground

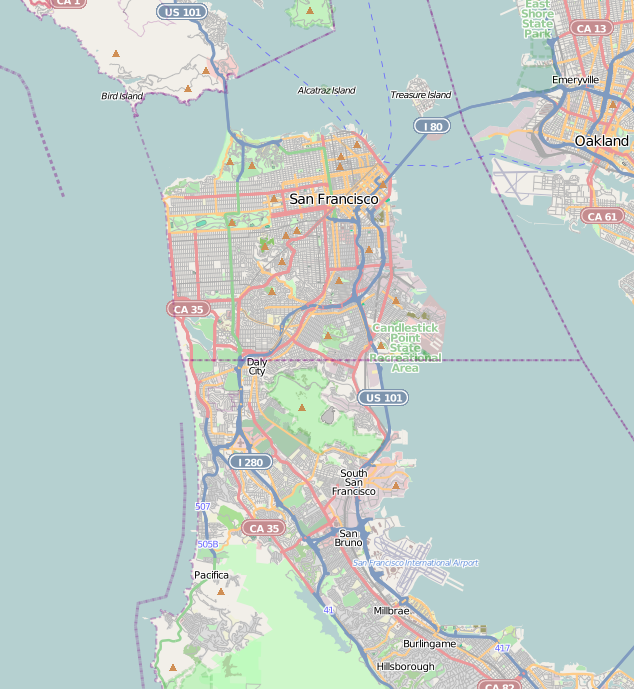
- Location within San Francisco
- Coordinates: 37°48′36″N 122°21′58″W
- Country: United States
- State: California
- City: San Francisco

Yerba Buena Island (Spanish: Isla Yerba Buena) sits in San Francisco Bay within the borders of the City and County of San Francisco. The Yerba Buena Tunnel runs through its center and connects the western and eastern spans of the San Francisco–Oakland Bay Bridge, linking the city with Oakland, California. Treasure Island is connected by a causeway to Yerba Buena Island. According to the United States Census Bureau, Yerba Buena Island and Treasure Island together have a land area of 0.901 square miles (2.33 km^{2}) with a total population of 2,500 as of the 2010 census.

Yerba Buena Island has had several other names over the decades: Sea Bird Island, Wood Island, and Goat Island. The island may have been named after the pueblo of Yerba Buena, which was named for the plant of the same name that was abundant in the area. The plant's English and Spanish common name, Yerba buena, is an alternate form of the Spanish hierba buena (literally meaning 'good herb'), generally used to describe local species of the mint family.

In 1939, the newly formed United States Coast Guard (USCG) took over control of the lighthouse above the island's southern shore. The USCG Sector San Francisco – Vessel Traffic Service (VTS) tower is located on Signal Road Building 278 atop the peak of the island. The USCG Sector San Francisco Headquarters is co-located with USCG Station San Francisco on Healy Avenue and Fresnel Way at water-level on the southeast coast of the island. The USCG Aids to Navigation San Francisco has a navigational buoy repair facility on Fresnel Way. The USCG Senior Officers' residences are in Quarters A, B, C, 8 and 9, off Hillcrest Road on the hill atop the USCG base. During the summer of 2011, the Department of Homeland Security / USCG opened the new SAFE Port Act (2006) Interagency Operations Center (IOC at Building 100 site on Spindrift Circle) on the USCG Sector / Station San Francisco base. The IOC houses the VTS, WatchKeeper and the USCG Sector San Francisco Command Center together in one building.

== History ==
Yerba Buena Island was the site of an Ohlone fishing village, Tuchayune.

The island's name dates to the Portola Expedition, appearing on Ayala's 1775 chart of the bay as "Isla de Alcatraces", or "island of the pelicans", for the birds who were abundant there. Later Frederick William Beechey, an English naval officer and explorer, transferred the name "Alcatraz Island" to the rock which bears the name of the federal penitentiary. The name "la Ysla de la Yerba Buena" was given by early Spanish colonists as early as 1795. Yerba buena can refer to any of a number of fragrant herbal plants. In this instance, it referred to the native plant Clinopodium douglasii which was found growing in abundance around the Bay Area. The plant has a fragrance like spearmint, also commonly referred to as yerba buena, so the name was applied to Clinopodium douglasii as well. It is not clear from any record if the island was named for the herb directly, or for the nearby cove and settlement of Yerba Buena.

The Isla de Yerba Buena was granted to one of the sons or grandsons of Joaquin Isidro de Castro (b.1732, Sinaloa), progenitor of one of the largest Californio families.

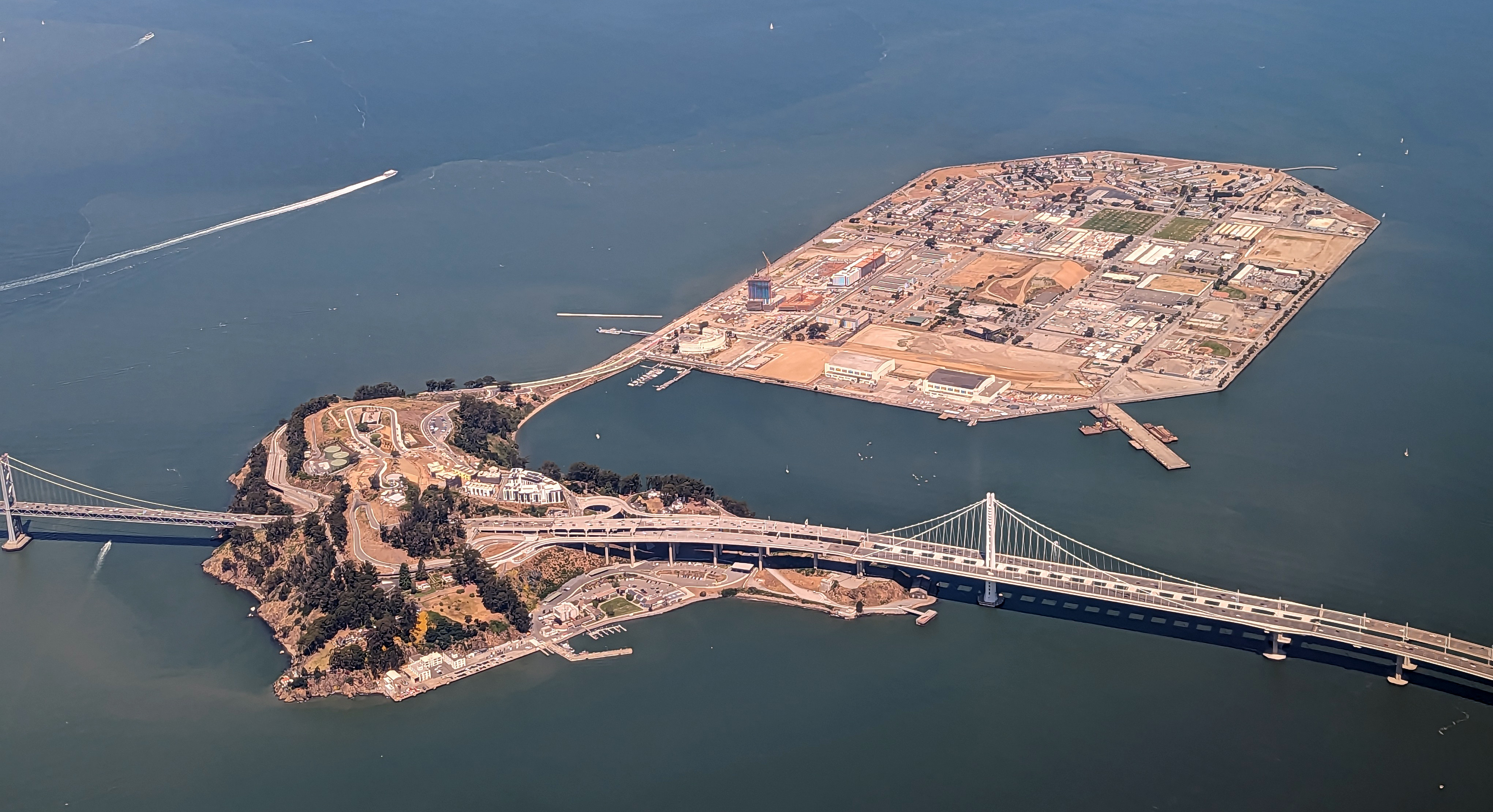
Aerial photo of Treasure Island (top) and Yerba Buena Island (bottom)

Officially, the island was Yerba Buena Island until 1895, when on a decision by the United States Board on Geographic Names, it was changed to Goat Island. During the gold rush, a large number of goats were pastured on the island, by Juan Fuller, the first laundryman, and butcher. The name "Goat Island", came into widespread use. It was changed back to Yerba Buena Island on June 3, 1931.

On March 3, 1871, Representative Stephen L. Mayham of the Subcommittee on Private Land Claims reported an unsuccessful claim by Thomas H. Dowling that he had purchased Yerba Buena Island on September 10, 1849, from Gorham Hyronemo Nye, who had received the island in 1835 "as a compensation for transporting the body of the deceased Governor José Figueroa from Monterey to Santa Barbara".

The idea of a military post on Yerba Buena Island originated during the American Civil War, when it was feared a raiding Confederate warship could slip past Fort Point and Alcatraz Island during a foggy night. However, it was not until the 1870s that Army Post Camp Yerba Buena Island (a.k.a. Army Post Camp Decature a.k.a. Army Post at Goat island a.k.a. US Engineer Depot, Yerba Buena Island and a.k.a. US Quartermaster Depot, Yerba Buena Island) by Navy Road and North Gate Road was completed, including a fog signal and octagonal lighthouse called Yerba Buena Light (1875) that remain today at the end of Hillcrest Road. In 1891, the United States Army Corps of Engineers built a Torpedo Station / Shed / Storehouse / Assembly building (Building 262) at the end of Army Road by North Gate Road. The torpedoes were actually floating mines that could be placed in the bay via cable for defense against intruding enemy vessels. The Torpedo Station was abandoned in the 1930s but still stands today (hidden underneath the San Francisco-Oakland Bay Bridge) listed in the National Register of Historic Places.

Just before the turn of the 20th century, the first U.S. Naval Training Station on the Pacific Coast was established on the north east side of the island by 1st Street and North Gate Road. Quarters One, also known as the Admiral Nimitz House near the intersection of Whiting Way and Garden Way, was built about 1900 as the Naval Training Station commandant's residence and is among the eight surviving officers' residences in the historic district. Its Classic Revival style, fashionable for private residences in the Bay Area at the time, was unusual for naval base housing. In 1963, Nimitz and his wife moved to the Nimitz House, where he died in 1966. His funeral was at the base chapel on Treasure Island and he was buried with full military honors at Golden Gate National Cemetery in San Bruno.

The training station closed after World War I. It was replaced as a West Coast training station in 1923 by Naval Training Center San Diego. Although the training station closed, the Navy maintained a presence with the stationary receiving ship USS Boston (1884), later renamed USS Despatch (IX-2) (1940), anchored in the harbor through World War II.

During World War II, Yerba Buena Island fell under the jurisdiction of Treasure Island Naval Station, the main headquarters of the 12th Naval District inside Building One. Built on the shoals of Yerba Buena Island, the 403-acre (163-hectare) Treasure Island was a Works Progress Administration project in the 1930s. After hosting the 1939 Golden Gate International Exposition, the United States Navy deemed Treasure Island an ideal location for transporting people and machines to the Pacific theater, and on April 17, 1942, established Treasure Island Naval Station (for surface ships and submarines) and as an Auxiliary Air Facility airfield (for airships, blimps, dirigibles, planes, and seaplanes) which also included a portion of Yerba Buena Island. Quarters One became the residence of the Commander in Chief, U.S. Pacific Fleet (CINCPACFLT). Furthermore, several other buildings used by the Naval Station during World War II remain on the island, including the Senior Officers' Quarters in Quarters A, B, C, 2, 3, 4, 5, 6, 7, 8, and 9. Buildings 83, 205, and 230 were support facilities for the senior officers' quarters.

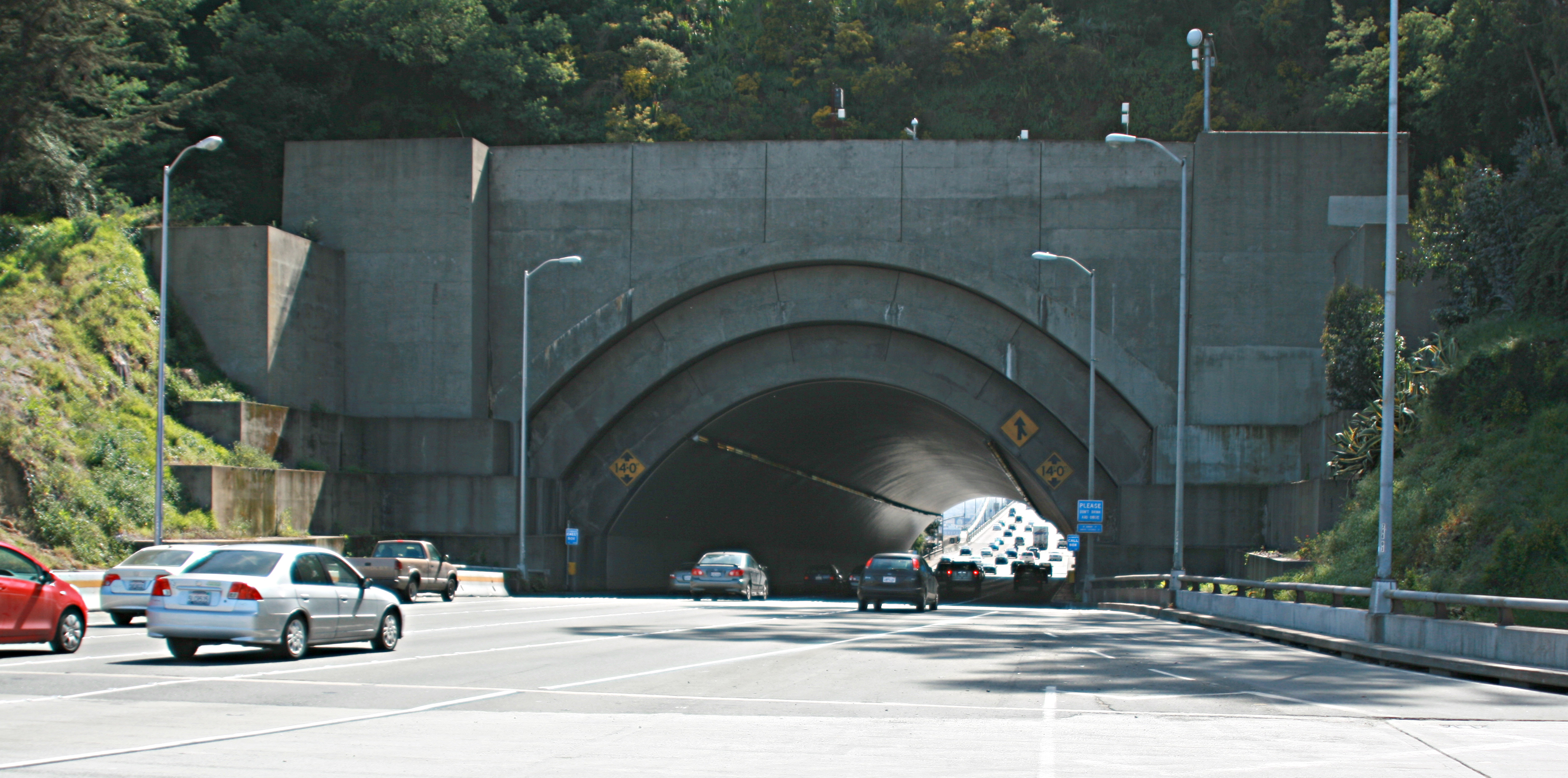
Yerba Buena Tunnel, a double-deck tunnel, carries Bay Bridge traffic between the eastern and western spans, seen here westbound

In 1996, the naval base and the Presidio of San Francisco were decommissioned and opened to public control under federal redevelopment guidelines. Quarters One by Whiting Way and the other Senior Officers' Quarter by Garden Way are listed on the National Register of Historic Places. The San Francisco Police Department (SFPD) took over law enforcement jurisdiction of non-USCG parcels of Yerba Buena Island. San Francisco Fire Department (SFFD) Fire Station 48 on Treasure Island took over medical rescue & fire protection of Yerba Buena Island (including USCG Sector / Station San Francisco) and portions of the San Francisco–Oakland Bay Bridge.

== Points of interest ==
Located west of the island was "Blossom Rock", a treacherous submerged rock that lay only 5 feet (1.5 m) below the surface of the water at low tide. Blossom Rock was discovered and named in 1826 by Captain Beechey of HMS Blossom. Beechey noted that the rock could be avoided by aligning the northern tip of Yerba Buena Island with two especially large redwood trees growing in the hills above Oakland as one entered the bay. These redwoods were located in what is now Roberts Regional Recreation Area, near the "Madrone" picnic area; now marked with a historical plaque. The "Navigation Trees" were cut down in about 1851, exacerbating the danger of Blossom Rock. The top of the rock was blown up in 1870, and another section removed by blasting in the early 1930s.

There are several San Francisco city/county parks now located on Yerba Buena Island.

The hillside trail/park near Treasure Island Road and Macalla Road was formerly the site of a military cemetery until the Bay Bridge traffic approach to the 1939 Golden Gate International Exposition necessitated its removal and transfer of graves to the San Francisco National Cemetery in the Presidio of San Francisco.

Also located on the island were Blue Park (now a parking lot) and Tower Park. A nearly 50-foot tower was built to replace the 1917 signal-station atop the island by the US Navy in the 1930s as an observation platform and control tower for seaplanes. That use became redundant with the introduction of trans-Pacific jet travel and the opening of the SFO seaplane harbor, but the structure was repurposed as a limited-capacity officers' club. The building was condemned after the 1989 Loma Prieta earthquake; it was used illicitly as a party-spot until it was demolished in 2016. New park facilities were built on the site in 2025; now called Signal Hill Park.

Two water reservoirs were located on the island, provided water storage for fire hydrant service to the island's military facilities and to Treasure Island. Naval Reservoir 162 was decommissioned, and in 2024 converted to San Francisco's Panorama Park, containing "The Point of Infinity," a 69-foot tall sculpture by Hiroshi Sugimoto.

== Population ==
As of 2007, after the City of San Francisco received authority over the island from the US Navy, a small community of 40 households, comprising about 100 people, had developed on the island.

In 2011, the San Francisco Board of Supervisors approved a 20-year development of the island that aims to build two neighborhoods with up to 8,000 residences, of which 25 percent are designated for affordable housing.

In 2015, the City of San Francisco evicted the majority of residents to make room for the development. Yerba Buena Island residents were offered either to be paid roughly $5,000 and move off the island or move into an apartment on Treasure Island. Roughly two-thirds of the residents chose to be relocated to Treasure Island. As of 2023 a 124-condo complex called the Bristol has opened, as has an affordable apartment complex for veterans. Most of the other planned developments have been hung up in lawsuits.

== In popular culture ==
In his book Two Years Before the Mast, published in 1840, Richard Henry Dana, Jr. mentions in the last chapter, actually a postscript chapter added 20 years later, that his ship of the 1830s voyage anchored "between a small island, called Yerba Buena, and a gravel beach in a little bight or cove of the same name."

== Gallery ==
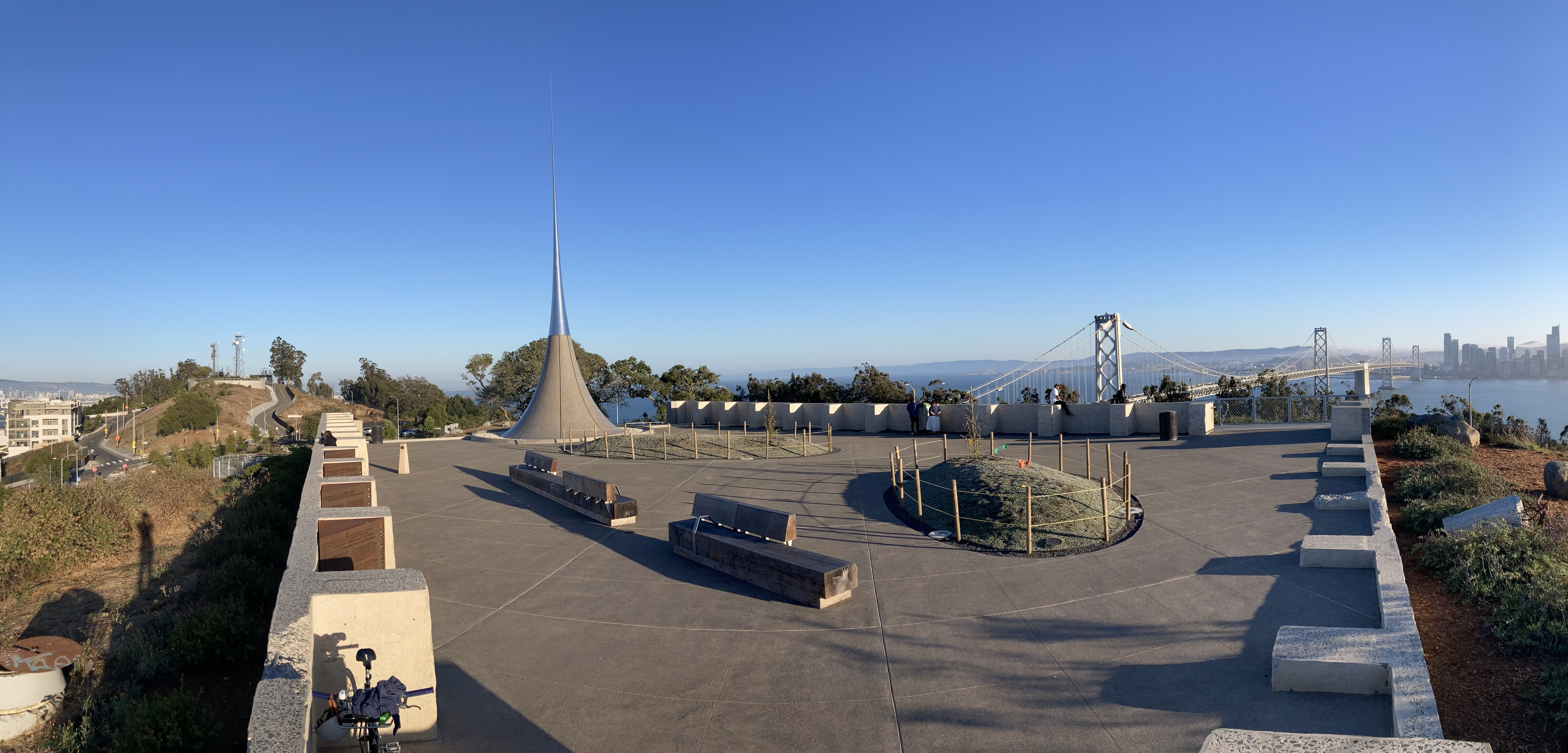
View of Panorama Park.

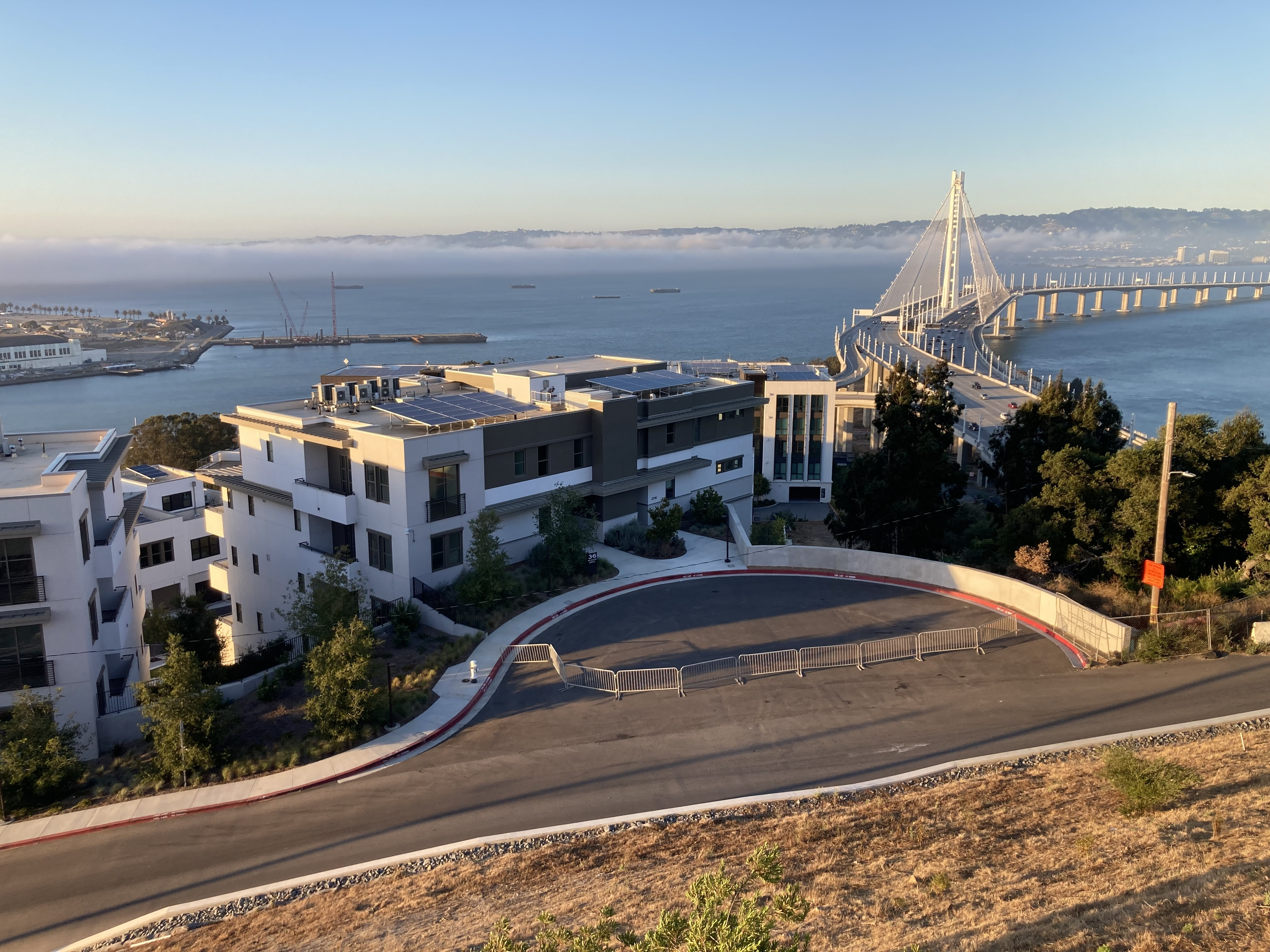
View of new housing developments and the San Francisco-Oakland Bay Bridge.

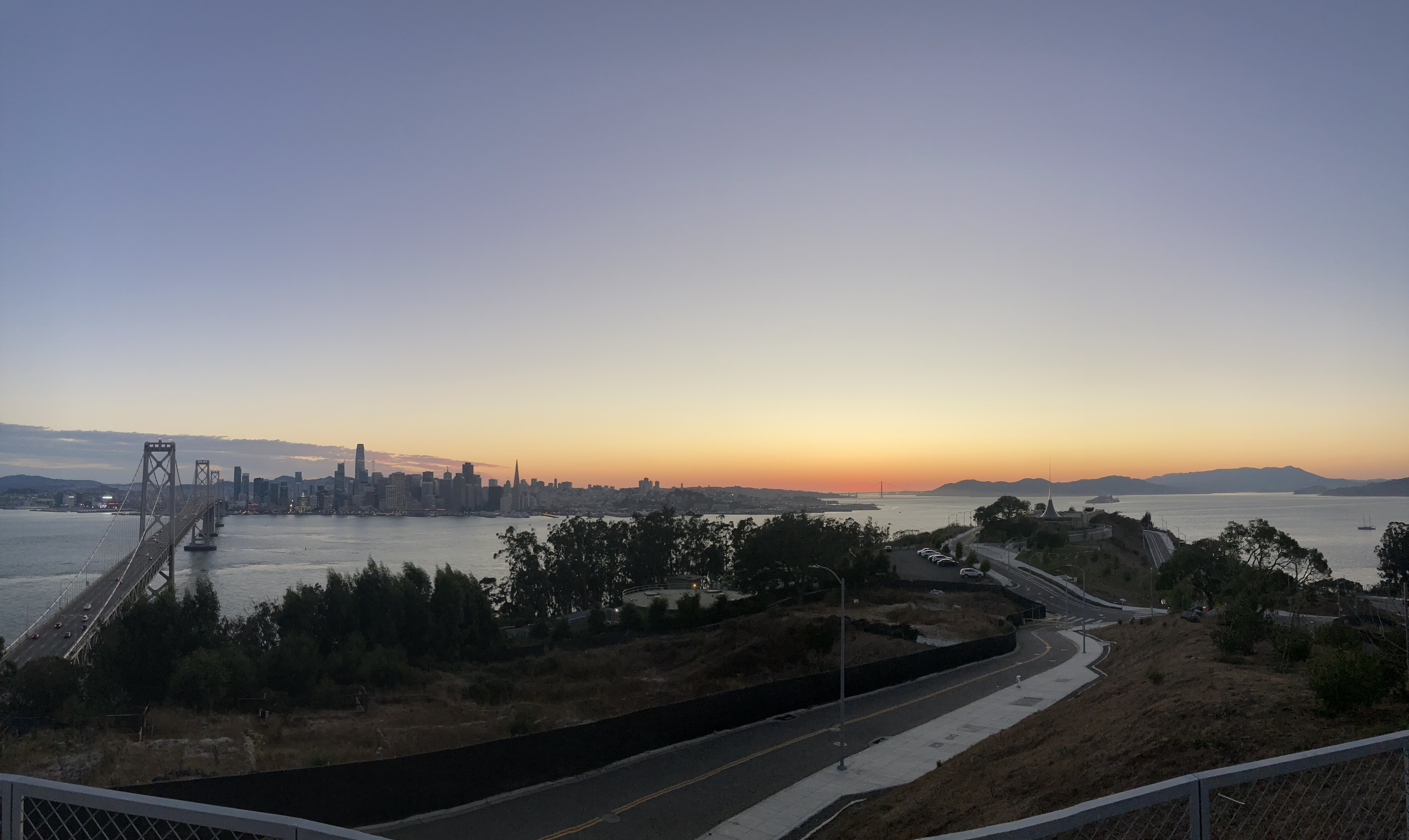
View of San Francisco from Yerba Buena in the evening.

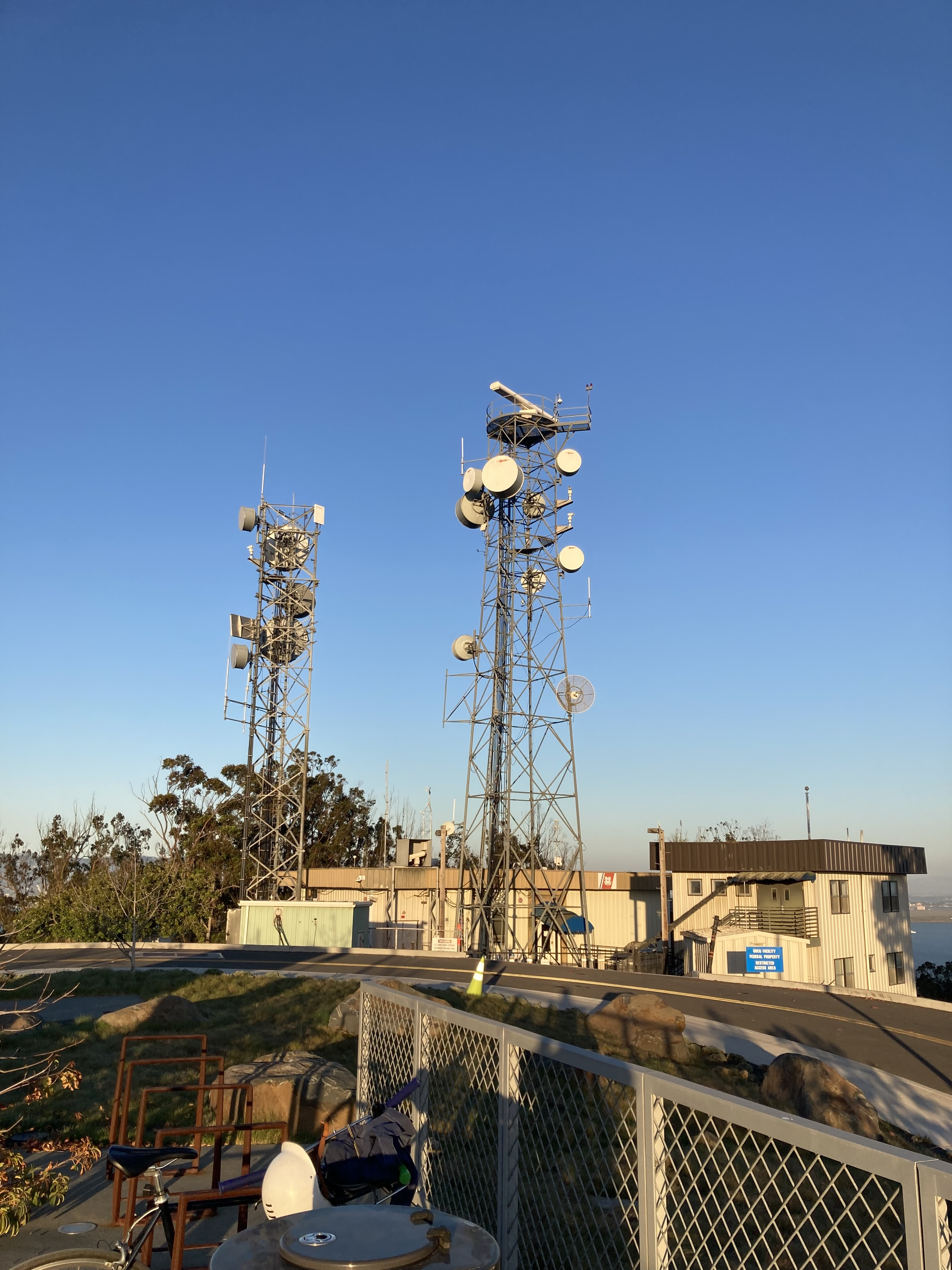
View of radio towers at the top of the island.

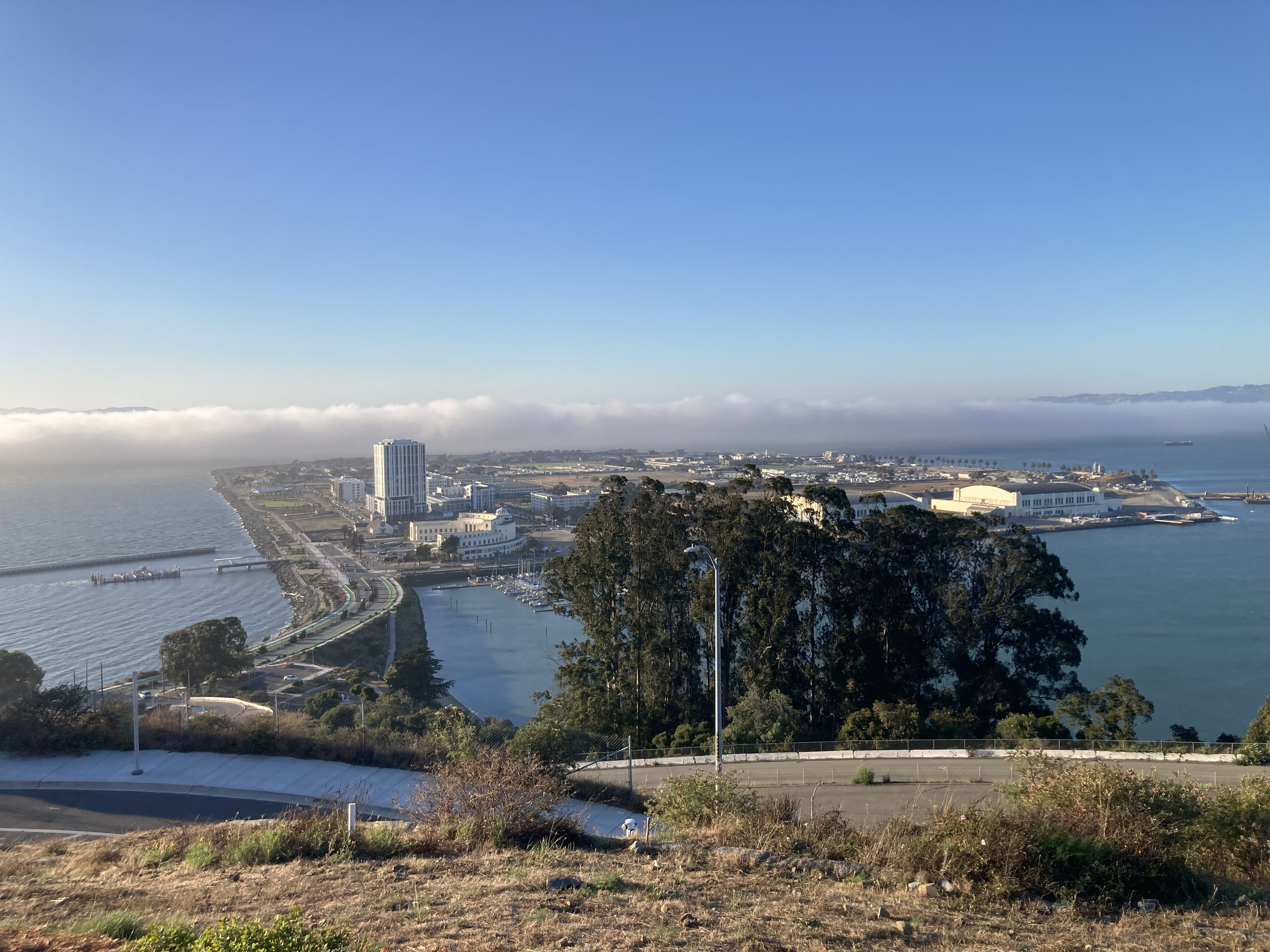
View of Treasure Island from Yerba Buena.

== See also ==
- Islands of San Francisco Bay
- Barnacle Bill
- Treasure Island
- Treasure Island development
