= Yaquina Bay State Recreation Site =

State park in Oregon, USA

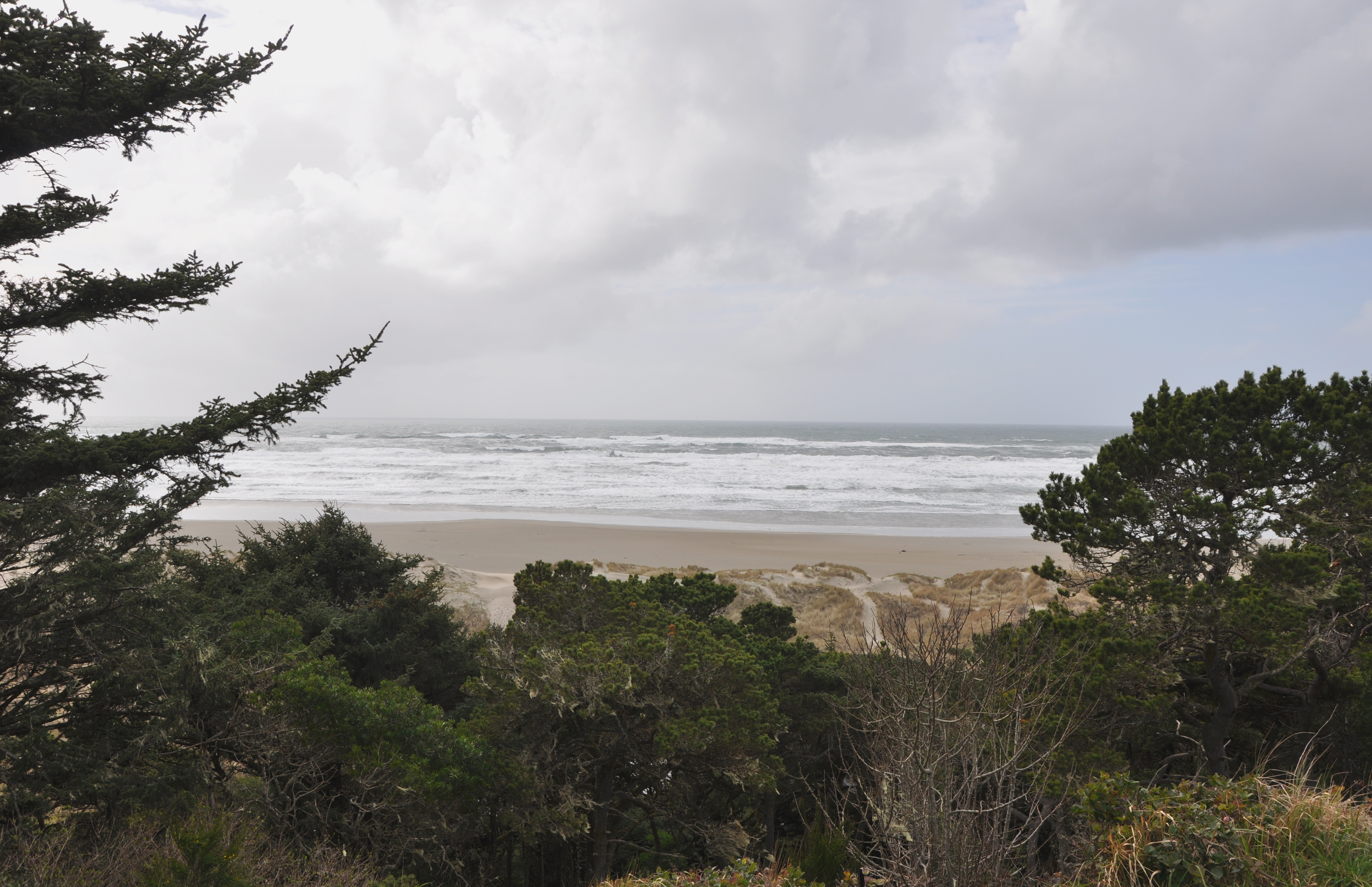
- Pacific Ocean from the park road

- Location within Oregon Location within the United States
- Type: Public, state
- Location: Newport, Lincoln County, Oregon, USA
- Coordinates: 44.62389°N 124.06194°W
- Created: 1948
- Operator: Oregon Parks and Recreation Department

Yaquina Bay State Recreation Site, established in 1948, is a coastal state park in west-central Lincoln County, Oregon, United States, in the city of Newport. It is administered by the Oregon Parks and Recreation Department, and located at the north end of Yaquina Bay near its outlet to the Pacific Ocean. The site includes picnic facilities, beach access, a fisherman's memorial shrine, a forested bluff and the historic Yaquina Bay Lighthouse.

== See also ==
- List of Oregon State Parks

== Gallery ==
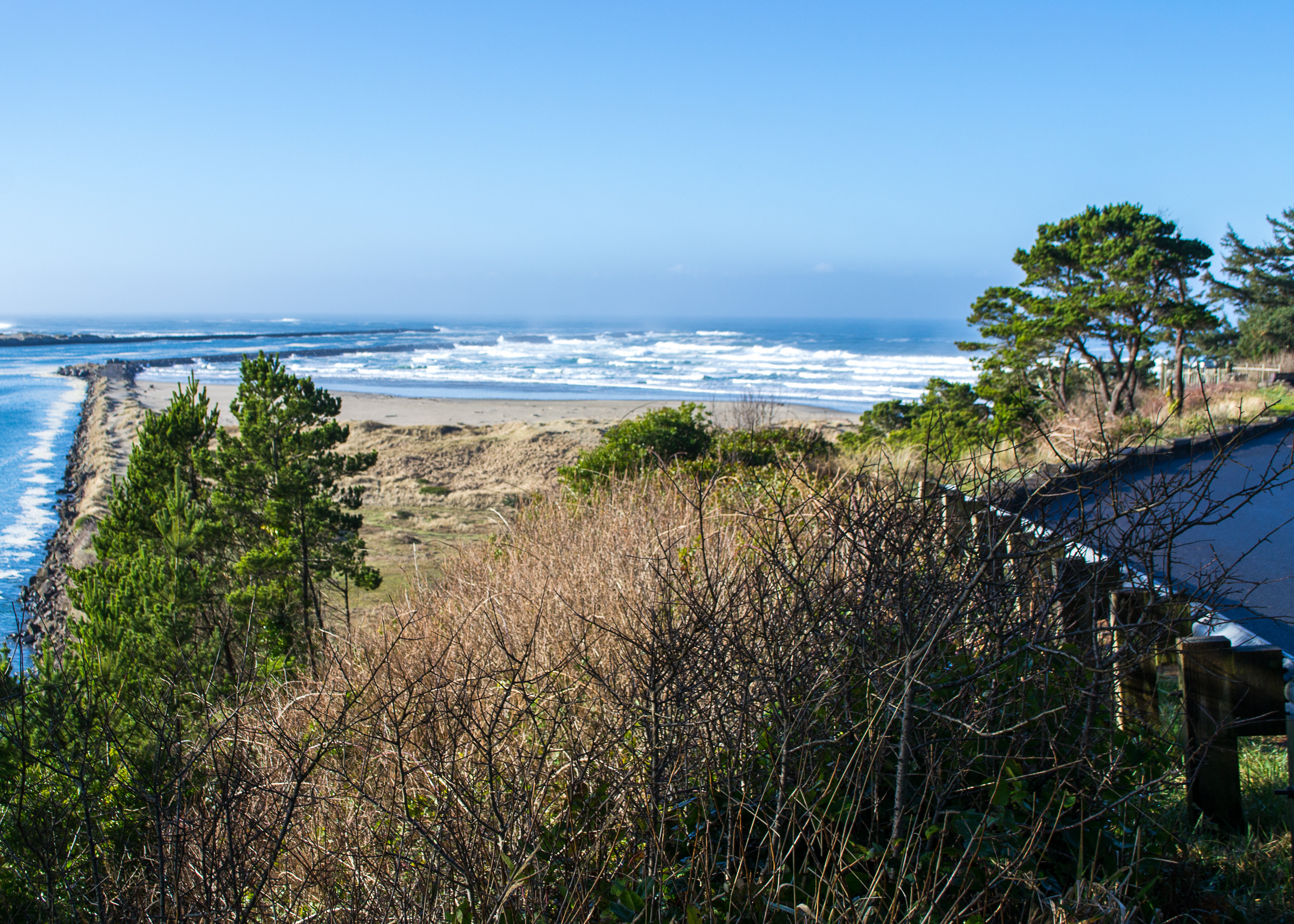
North and south jetties and Yaquina Bay State Recreation Site

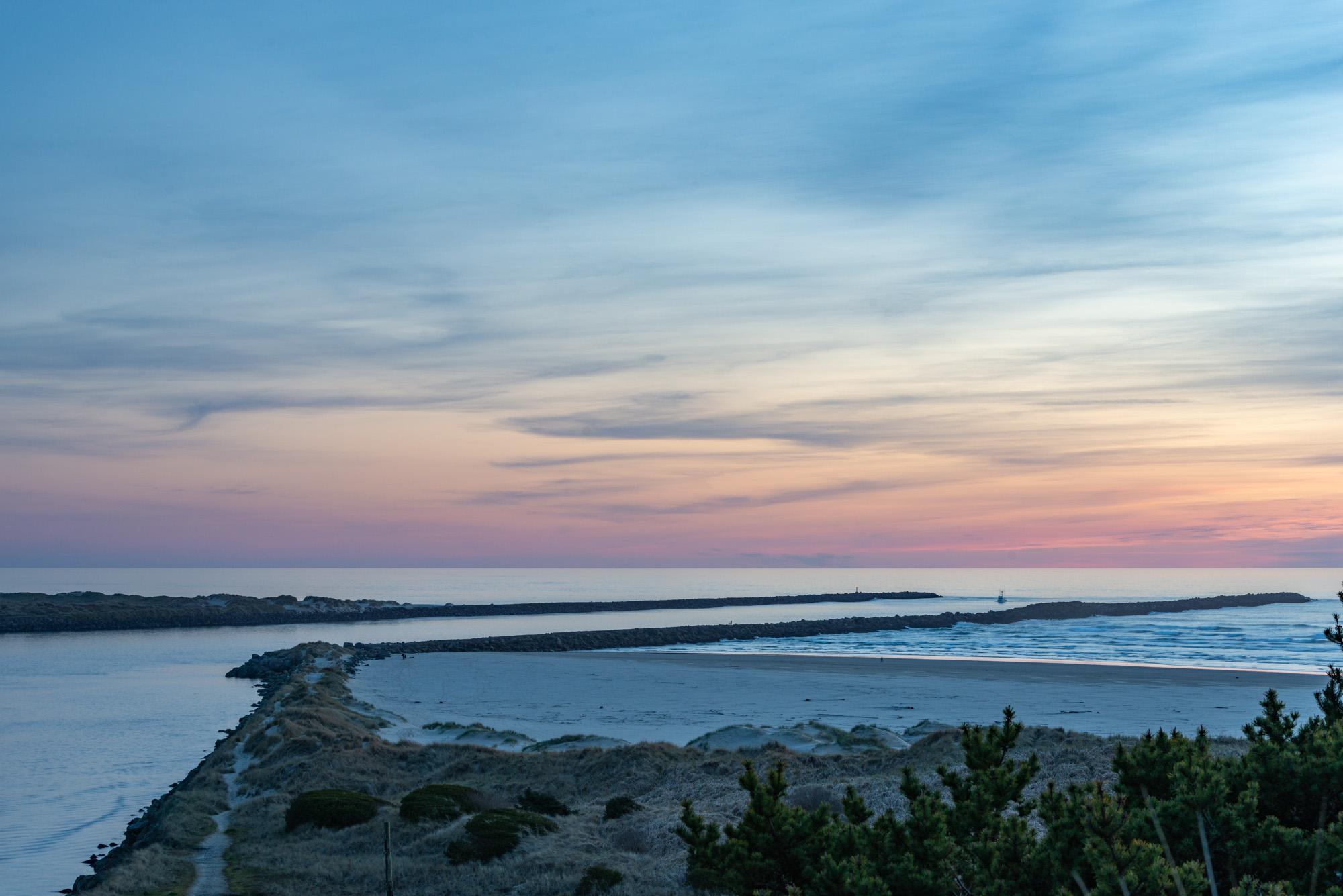
Yaquina Bay State Recreation Site, 2022.
