= Yaquina Bay =

Small bay partially within Newport, Oregon, United States

Coordinates: 44.618089°N 124.030151°W

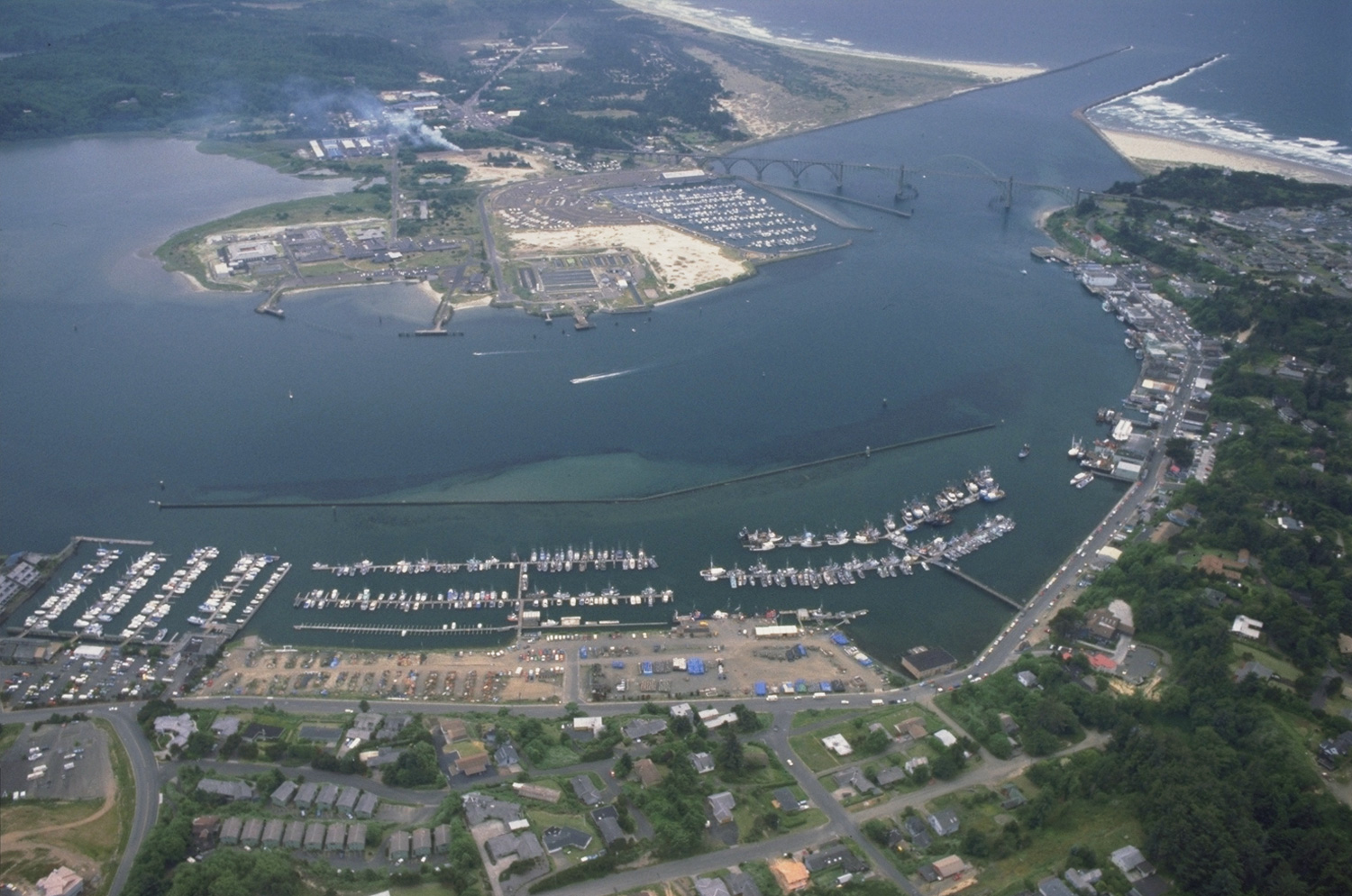
A June 1990 aerial photo of Yaquina Bay in Newport, Oregon

Yaquina Bay (/jəˈkwɪnə/ yə-KWIN-ə) is a coastal estuarine community found in Newport, Oregon. Yaquina Bay is a semi-enclosed body of water, approximately 8 km^{2} (3.2 mi^{2}) in area, with free connection to the Pacific Ocean, but also diluted with freshwater from the Yaquina River land drainage. The Bay is traversed by the Yaquina Bay Bridge.

Two small cities border the Yaquina River and Bay: Newport (population approx. 9,989), and Toledo (population approx. 3,459). The Yaquina Bay in Newport is a popular tourist destination along the Pacific Coast Highway. It is also an important estuary for the area's ecology and economy.

== History ==
Yaquina Bay is named after the Yaquina Tribe that occupied the territory along the Yaquina River. When the railroad came to the area in the late 1880s, many thought Yaquina Bay would be the commerce center for the Pacific Northwest. Wheat, lumber, and other goods were transported to Yaquina Bay as the area began to develop. Oyster companies and other merchants were founded along the bay.

=== Exploration and settlement ===
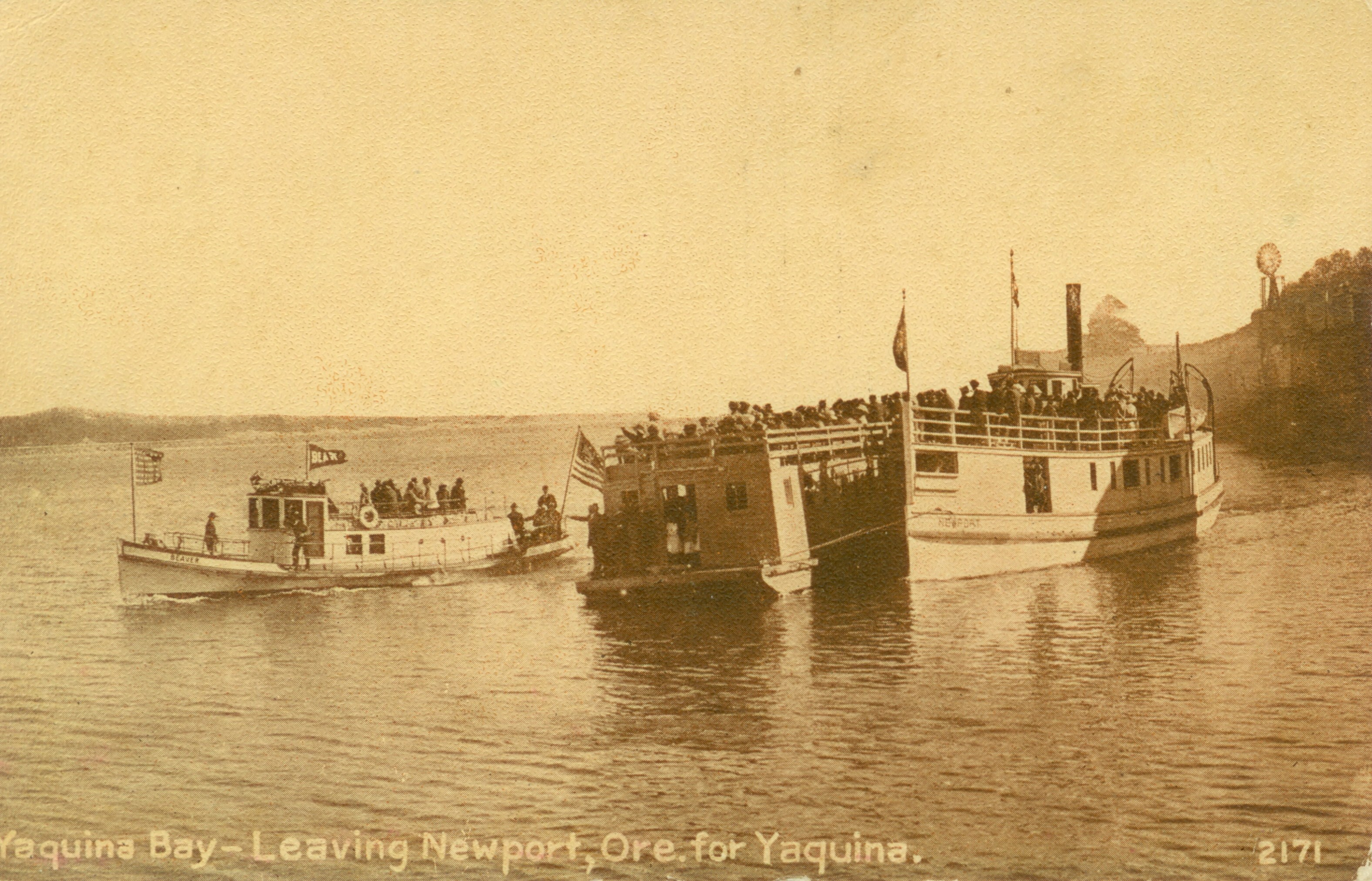
A steamboat leaves Yaquina Bay in 1910

The indigenous peoples of the region have called the Yaquina Bay area home for centuries. In 1856, the first vessel entered Yaquina Bay, carrying supplies for the Siletz Block-houses of the Coastal Indian Reservation up the Yaquina River. Bay access promised many advantages, particularly open transportation and shipping to and from San Francisco Bay. The same year, a doctor from the Willamette Valley was appointed surgeon to an Indian agency in Yaquina Bay. Following Indian trails through the Coast Range, the doctor, along with three other explorers, set out for the Coast in a quest for his new appointment.

In 1861, Captain Spencer, from the state of Washington, first settled near Yaquina Bay. Spencer, with the assistance of a local Indian guide, discovered valuable oyster beds within the bay, which would attract future businesses, particularly firms from San Francisco.

In 1866, news spread of the promises and new life Yaquina Bay had to offer, and it quickly brought a surge of settlers to the area. Newport was quickly formed and oyster companies and other industries began to take residence. The growing oyster business initiated the construction of a wagon road from Corvallis to Yaquina Bay, costing approximately $20,000 and spanning 45 miles. The road was completed in 1873 and promised continued connections between Corvallis and the Coast, and helped settlers reach their new coastal home.

With the influx of residents, seasonal visitors to the area, and booming businesses, Yaquina Bay's oyster trade quickly began to decline. In 1869, a group of oystermen formed a task force with the interest of preserving the oyster beds. To better the public's interest and their own, they worked diligently to restore and protect the oyster communities.

Shortly after the establishment of Newport, the Yaquina Bay lighthouse began construction in 1871. However, with the establishment of the Yaquina Head lighthouse to the north, the lighthouse on the bay was decommissioned in 1874.

For a long time, Yaquina Bay's port was the midpoint between the ports of San Francisco and Seattle. With increased ship and navigation traffic into the area, the number of shipwrecks increased rapidly.

== Economy ==
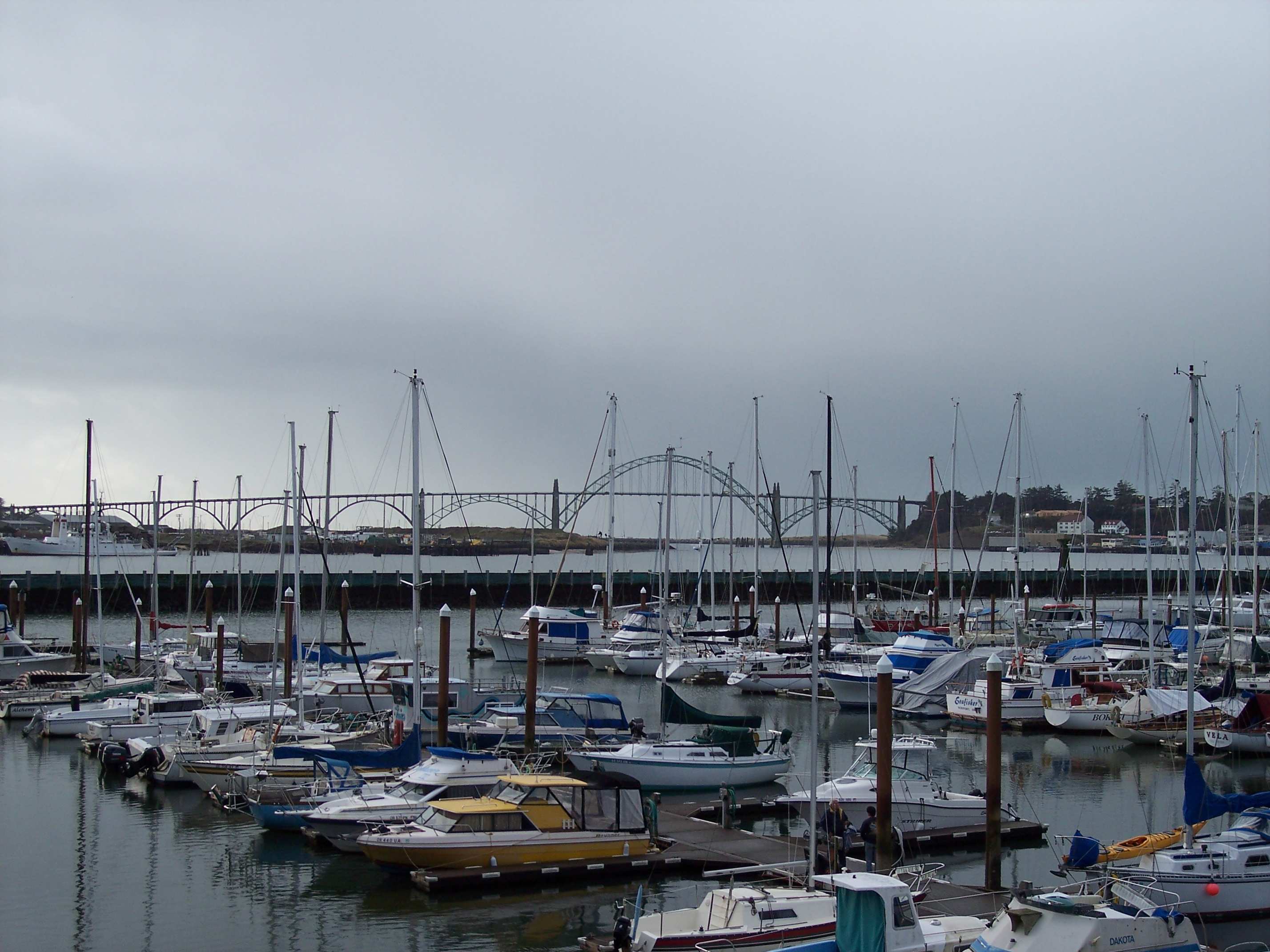
Recreational boats on Yaquina Bay in January 2004

Yaquina Bay and its watershed have multiple uses, including fishing, tourism, recreation, and research. As of 2014, the highest percentage of the Newport workforce is employed in management, business, science, and arts (36.7%), while only 8.9% are employed in natural resources, construction, and maintenance. Agriculture is a small percentage of the economy in Lincoln County, but has increased in the past ten years. While timber harvesting has been a historic contributor to the economy, this industry has since decreased. Employment had declined by 82% between about 1980 and 2000.

=== Fisheries and aquaculture ===
In 2015, Pacific Whiting, or North Pacific Hake, was the largest source of fish caught by commercial fisheries from Newport, while Pink Shrimp brought in the greatest dollar amount. As of 2015, the value of commercial fisheries out of Newport totals approximately $33,221,009. Recreational fishing also occurs in Yaquina Bay, with perch, rockfish, herring, chinook salmon, clams, and crabs being the popular catch. Aquaculture of oysters also occurs in Yaquina Bay, totaling 1,172 pounds in 2012.

=== Recreation and tourism ===
Yaquina Bay Harbor houses commercial and recreational fishing vessels, other recreational boats, government vessels, and research vessels. Tourism represents a substantial contributor to the county economy, accounting for $133.8 million in industry income in 2012. Some tourist destinations include South Beach State Park, Yaquina Bay State Recreation Site, the Oregon Coast Aquarium, restaurants, shops, and attractions on the Bayfront, and Hatfield Marine Science Center.

== Physical geography ==
=== Physical characteristics ===
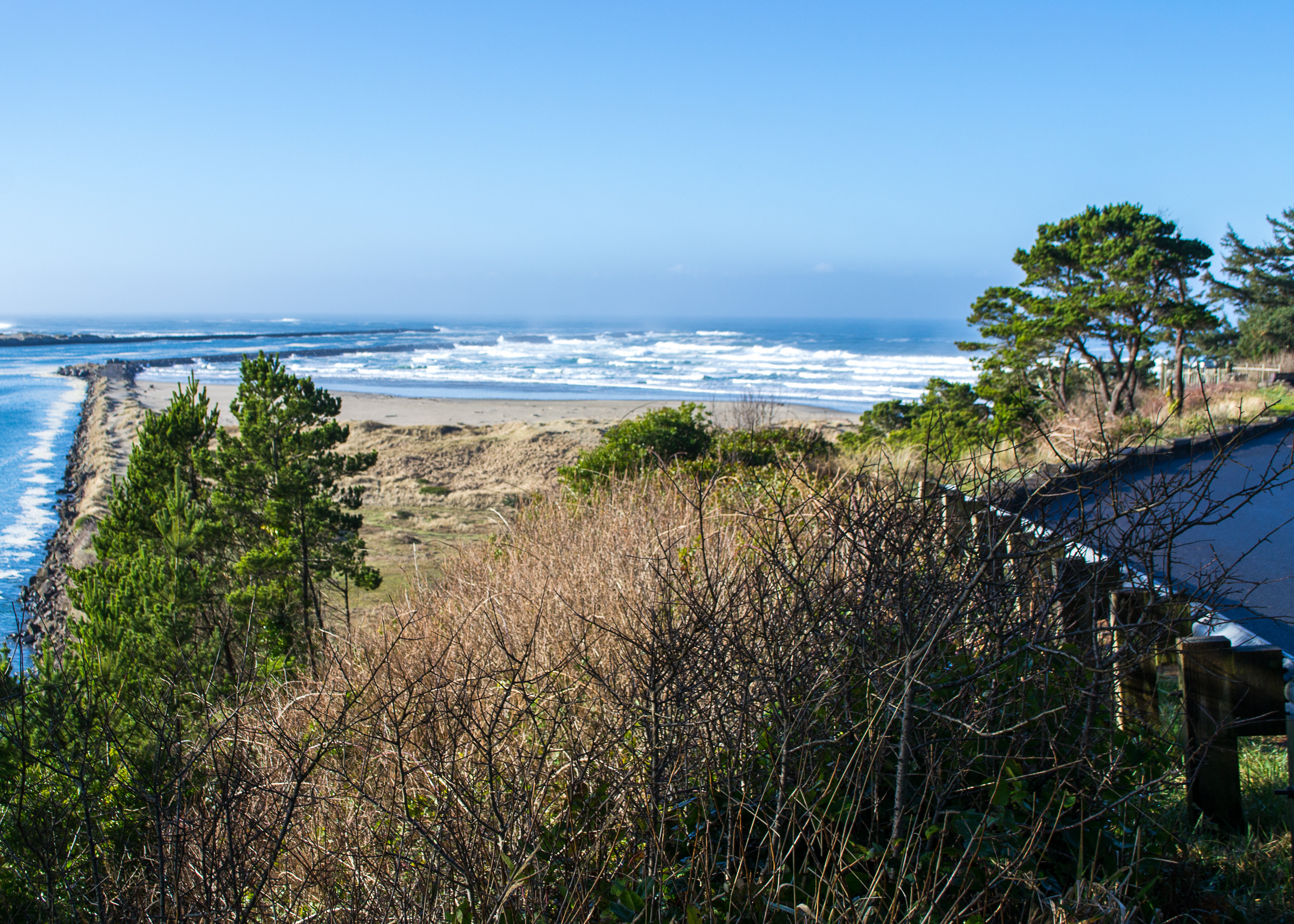
Yaquina Bay jetties in February 2013

Yaquina Bay is a characteristic estuary, with freshwater input from the Yaquina River as well as an open access to the Pacific Ocean introducing ocean saltwater. Yaquina Bay is maintained at 6.7 m (22 ft) in depth with the help of dredging, but depth decreases upstream with the occurrence of shoals, tidal flats, and other shallow zones. The estuary is about 11.6 km^{2} at mean tide and can decrease to 9.1 km^{2} at mean low tide. The North and South Yaquina Jetties, at the junction between the Pacific Ocean and Yaquina Bay, were constructed in 1888.

Predictions of tidal height and times are based on National Oceanic Atmospheric Administration (NOAA) data with respect to Hatfield Marine Science Center's Center Dock. Yaquina Bay's high and low tidal range is approximately 2.4 m (7.9 ft). Tidal flux is typically vigorous and allows intense mixing near the mouth of the Bay. However, there is seasonal variation on mixing within the estuary. During the summer and early months, June to October, the estuary is well-mixed contrasted to the winter months, November to May, when the estuary is more stratified. Due to the variation in tides and mixing, the salinity changes drastically depending on location within the Bay. Average salinity at the mouth of the Bay is 34 psu, whereas the salinity upriver is 0.

The Yaquina River is 95 km (59 mi) long, beginning at the Central Oregon Coast Range, rounding past multiple bordered cities, and eventually opening up into Yaquina Bay. The river provides nutrients for the Bay and supports a variety of biology.

=== Sediments and deposition ===
Sediments that are found within Yaquina Bay are derived from tertiary rocks from the Central Oregon Coast Range, Pleistocene marine sediments and estuarine deposits. These sediments have three realms of deposition; marine deposition, fluviatile, and an intermediate transition state called marine-fluviatile. Marine deposition is found within the initial 2.4 km (1.5 mi) of the estuary and is associated with average ocean salinity and turbulent mixing. The sediment is similar in texture to sand and other fine grains. Fluviatile deposition extends from the point of freshwater input up to 9.7 km (6 mi) into the Bay, with its sediments more coarse. The transition stage between these two realms contains sediment mixes from the marine and fluviatile areas.

The last recorded rate of sediment deposition was in 1936, with a recorded estimate of 23 cm (9.1 in) annually. However, deposition is subject to seasonal variations. Maximum deposition takes place in the winter and early spring when river runoff is highest due to increased rain, when the longshore drift is coming from the south, and when winds are from the southwest. In the summer, deposition is low because of lower runoff, southward longshore drift and northwest winds.

Turbulent mixing within the estuary increases the amount of suspended sediment and therefore increases the turbidity within Yaquina Bay. Turbidity has been found to be most prominent when river runoff is low, typically during the summer. Chlorophyll concentrations and other measurements of water chemistry (see Chemistry section below) verify these observations.

=== Geology ===
Yaquina Bay was formed roughly 2.2 million years ago in the Oligocene Epoch of the Cenozoic Era. Increased sedimentation and subsidence contributed to formation of Yaquina Bay. Sedimentary rocks in this area are mainly "sandstone, siltstone and clay-containing mudstone", as indicated in geological samples from the sediments. The oldest rocks found in the Coast Range and in Yaquina Bay date back to Paleocene and Eocene Epochs, about 40-60 million years ago. The seafloor to the west of Oregon is continually spreading and there is evidence of subduction taking place along the coast of Oregon and Washington.

== Biology ==
Yaquina Bay comprises several different habitats that provide resources for many species. These habitats include intertidal eelgrass beds, mudflats, and sandflats, and subtidal areas. Mudflats and sandflats are typically covered by water during high tide and exposed to air during low tide, while subtidal areas are covered by water almost all of the time.

=== Life in Yaquina Bay ===
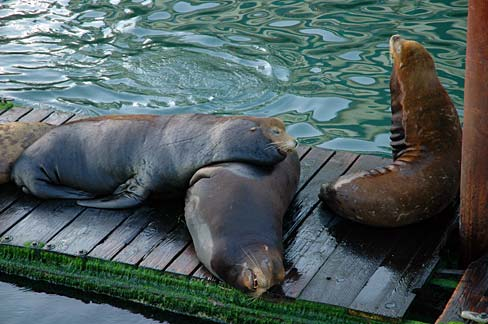
Male Zalophus sea lions in Yaquina Bay in 2021

Beds of native eelgrass (Zostera marina) and beds of invasive eelgrass (Zostera japonica) grow separately and provide a distinct habitat for certain organisms. Birds, including gulls, ducks, shorebirds, crows, geese, egrets, rails, pelicans and cormorants are present in Yaquina Bay using the eelgrass and mudflats as habitats. Mud shrimp also live in mudflats, and they play an important role in nutrient cycling within the estuary. Burrows in the mud made by mud shrimp pump oxygen deeper into the sediment, which makes it available for microbes to use. Mud shrimp activity has also been shown to increase the movement of carbon and dissolved inorganic nitrogen in and out of the mud. Some species of diatoms, a type of phytoplankton, can be found on the sediments of Yaquina Bay wetlands. These diatoms are also important in nutrient cycling within the estuary.

Another type of estuary habitat is formed by native Olympia oysters (Ostrea lurida). These are historically abundant in Yaquina Bay, and in addition to creating hard surfaces in the estuary, oysters also filter the bay water and provide food for local people. In fact, settlement on the mouth of Yaquina Bay is attributed in part to the oyster fishery.

In subtidal areas, marine mammals such as harbor seals and California sea lions are sometimes present in Yaquina Bay. Sea lions in the estuary are mostly male. They move through the estuary, but spend a lot of time near the Bayfront or hauled out on docks, perhaps due to the additional food or safety. Some fish species present in Yaquina Bay include English sole and sculpin, in addition to river lamprey, lingcod, anchovies, Pacific herring, sturgeon, flounder, and salmon. Clams and Dungeness crabs are also present within the bay and make up a resource for recreational fishers.

=== The estuary as a nursery ===
Yaquina Bay has been shown to be a site for spawning and development of many species. Pacific Herring and bay goby larvae are abundant, but other larval fishes such as sculpin, anchovy, smelt, clingfishes, cod, stickleback, pipefish, prickleback, gunnels, sandlance, rockfish, greenlings, lumpfish, and flounder are present in the estuary. Although there are larval fish present in the estuary, the Pacific herring was found to be the only commercial species that relies on the estuary for spawning and development. Yaquina Bay also provides a nursery environment for English sole. Multiple species of juvenile salmon, including chum, coho, and chinook, also pass through Yaquina Bay during their life cycle, often transitioning from shallower to deeper waters as they grow.

== Chemistry of Yaquina Bay ==
The Yaquina Bay estuarine chemistry is influenced by daily tides, river sediment input, summer upwelling along the coast, and biological processes.

=== Tides ===
Yaquina Bay experiences mixed semidiurnal tides, ranging from 1.9 to 2.5 m (6.2-8.2 ft) daily. The influx of water from the ocean changes the salinity of the estuary, creating a salt intrusion that has been estimated to reach as far as 21.8 km (13.5 mi) upriver. Daily tidal changes affect estuary mixing and stratification. Flood tides coming from the ocean bring coastal nutrients like nitrogen and phosphorus into the estuary. During mixing events, the Yaquina Bay estuary experiences changes in gradients for salinity, concentration of chemical species, and suspended sediment, which in turn influences biological productivity. The Yaquina Bay estuary has high primary productivity throughout the year due to high dissolved oxygen concentrations and cool water temperature from tidal flushing. Logging practices also occurred in the Yaquina Bay estuary from the 1920s to the 1980s.

=== Nutrients ===
==== Silicon ====
Sediment input from the Yaquina River contributes to the Yaquina Bay estuary chemistry, varying with seasonal rainfall. In the winter, when there is higher rainfall and therefore more input from the river, siliceous diatoms are more abundant and have higher species diversity. This is contrasted with fewer diatom species in seasons when there is less rainfall.

Rocks are mostly made of silica and when land weathering takes place, rocks are broken down into their smaller silica components. With increased rainfall and sediment transport, this weathering provides a source of silica for diatoms in Yaquina Bay.

The upstream Yaquina River source material is more quartz dominated (more silica) than downstream source material. Some of the heavy minerals upstream include micas (biotite and muscovite made of potassium, aluminum, and silica), hematite (iron), and limonite (iron oxides). Near the coastal shoreline and mouth of the Yaquina Bay estuary, the sand grains are mostly feldspars and chert (silica), and volcanic fragments (most likely high in silica, potassium, aluminum, sodium, and calcium). In nearshore marine deposit sediment, the source material is less quartz (less silica) compared to upriver sources; heavy minerals include pyroxene (a group of silicate minerals), hypersthene (magnesium iron silica), and diopside (magnesium calcium silica).

==== Carbon ====
Organic carbon concentrations of the Yaquina Bay estuary vary depending on depth. Concentrations are lowest in the channel (<0.2%) and highest in shallower sediments, particularly from samples collected at tidal flats (2.7%). About 1-7% of sand in the Yaquina Bay estuary is made of carbonates like mollusk shell fragments and foraminifera. Carbonate concentrations are higher in the bay channel (5%) and decrease towards the bay margin (3%).

==== Nitrogen ====
Major nitrogen sources for the Yaquina Bay estuary change with season. During drier seasons, the ocean is the major nitrogen source while the river is the major source in wetter seasons, where river discharge can be up to five times higher than drier seasons. Samples taken at the surface with varying salinities showed dissolved inorganic nitrogen is found mostly at the two salinity extremes; the mouth of the estuary and up the Yaquina River. The input at the mouth of Yaquina Bay indicates input from upwelled waters during the summer season. The nutrient flux into the estuary is enough to sustain primary productivity during the summer months.

==== Phosphorus ====
Phosphorus is generally a limiting nutrient in the ocean. In Pacific Northwest estuaries, an important source of phosphorus comes from ocean upwelling in the summer (see below). Samples taken at the surface with varying salinities showed dissolved inorganic phosphorus more prevalent in areas with higher salinities compared to lower, thus indicating the ocean as the source for this system.

==== Oxygen ====
Dissolved oxygen (DO) concentration is an important water quality parameter because of its close relationship with biological activity. In the Yaquina Bay estuary, DO levels may be lower and almost hypoxic due to low DO levels with coastal upwelled water imported into the estuary. DO levels of imported ocean water are dependent on physical factors (wind stress and cool water temperature) and biological factors (association with chlorophyll a and respiration). Ocean influence of DO levels in the estuary extends to about 10 km (6.2 mi) upriver. In the upper estuary beyond ocean influence, DO levels decrease with increasing temperature.

==== Chlorophyll a ====
Upwelling along Yaquina Bay's western coast

Chlorophyll a (Chl a) concentrations vary seasonally with ocean water import, particularly during summer upwelling. Variation of Chl a also depends on the timing of summer upwelling each year, where upwelling could occur earlier or be delayed. Oregon estuaries typically have low median Chl a levels, about less than 5 micrograms per liter of water. When high concentrations of Chl a are advected into the estuary, there is also an increase in flood tide DO levels.

=== Upwelling ===
Summer upwelling along the Oregon coast brings nutrients from deep waters up into the Yaquina Bay estuary. This event, along with decreased rain and river input, and increased light, all contribute to the seasonal chemistry variability in the Bay.

== Environment ==
=== Coastal hazards ===
As with any coastal zone, there are inherent hazards present. Especially in the Pacific Northwest, coastlines are impacted by large waves, storm surge, strong currents, wind, and rain. Yaquina Bay is seasonally affected by these impacts, with winter typically the most intense period. Storms and rain increase, which leads to more land runoff and also causes waves and currents to reshape the coastline.

Erosion is a challenge for Yaquina Bay and the entire Oregon Coast. Yaquina Bay's sediments are made up of sandstone, siltstone and clay-containing mudstone and these soft sediments contribute to annual erosion. Waves, however, are the main proponent of erosion. Waves are parallel to the beach and as wind increases, energy is enhanced and height grows, causing a devastating effect on beaches. Also, as currents run along the coast, they move sand causing either addition or depletion of sand in some areas. This has been evident around the Yaquina Jetty. With longshore drift increased during the winter, sand is deposited and dramatically built up in this area.

In 2002, researchers, stakeholders, and policy makers organized a vulnerability assessment to assess the current state of the coast in respect to future hazards occurring. They included Yaquina Bay in their case study, as this area is heavily influenced by tourism, businesses, industries, vessels, to name a few. The assessment was able to address areas of concern and helped businesses and industries by highlighting ways to adapt to the changing conditions to prevent future damage.

== See also ==
- Hatfield Marine Science Center
- Steamboats of Yaquina Bay and Yaquina River
- Yaquina Bay Bridge
- Yaquina Bay State Recreation Site
