= Yaquina Bay Light =

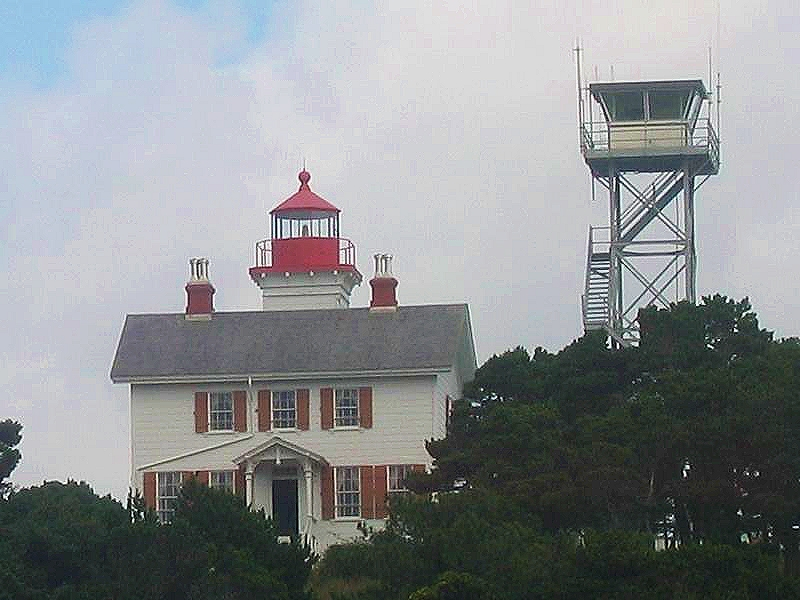
- Yaquina Bay Light
- Location: Yaquina Bay State Recreation Site
- Coordinates: 44.62415°N 124.06290°W

Tower
- Constructed: 1871
- Foundation: Natural/emplaced
- Construction: Wood
- Height: 51 feet (16 m)
- Shape: Square
- Heritage: National Register of Historic Places listed place

Light
- First lit: 1871
- Deactivated: 1874–1996
- Focal height: 50 m (160 ft)
- Lens: Fifth order Fresnel lens (original)/250MM (replacement)
- Range: 6 nmi (11 km; 6.9 mi)
- Characteristic: F W
- Old Yaquina Bay Lighthouse
- U.S. National Register of Historic Places
- Area: 2.3 acres (0.93 ha)
- Built: 1871
- Built by: Ben Simpson
- NRHP reference No.: 74001692
- Added to NRHP: 1970

The Yaquina Bay Light is a lighthouse that was built in 1871, soon after the founding of the city of Newport, Oregon, in the United States. It is located on the north side of Yaquina Bay. In 1871–1874, it was the busiest and most populated of the many coastal ports between Washington and California.

== History ==
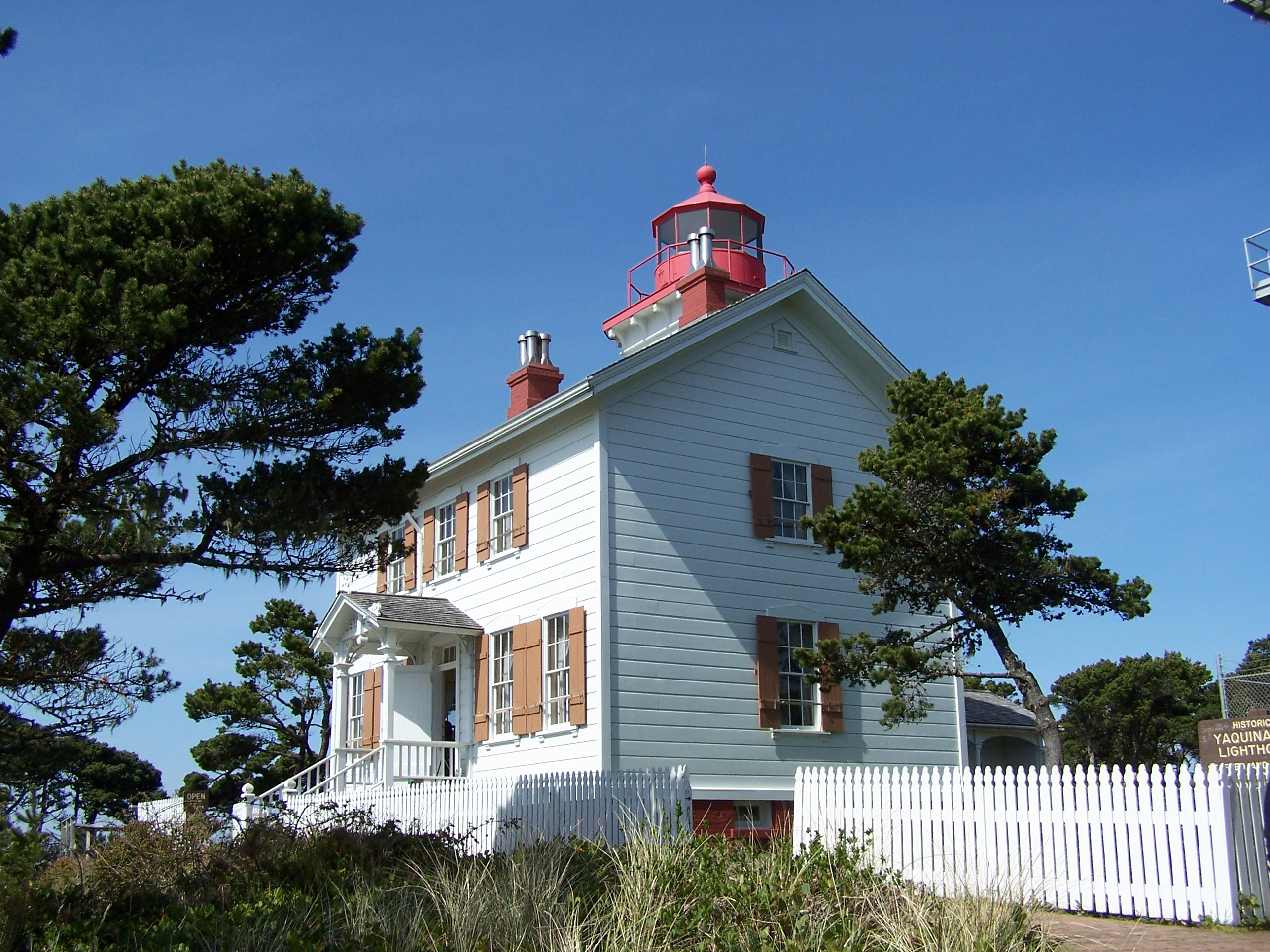
The side of the lighthouse

The Yaquina Bay Light was built by Ben Simpson and first lit on November 3, 1871. It was active for only three years due to the establishment of the larger Yaquina Head Light in 1873 that was located just 3 miles (4.8 km) north of the Yaquina Bay Light. So the lighthouse was decommissioned on October 1, 1874, because the newer Yaquina Head Light made it obsolete. The fifth-order Fresnel lens was then installed in the Yerba Buena Light in California for its opening in 1875.

The United States Army Corps of Engineers used the lighthouse from 1888 to 1896 as their living quarters while they built the North and South Jetties at the mouth of Yaquina Bay. The United States Coast Guard later used the lighthouse as lookout and living quarters from 1906 to 1915, before moving to their more central quarters which overlooked the busy Newport bayfront. During this period, the Coast Guard also built the eight-story steel observation tower that still stands next to the original lighthouse.

In 1934, the Oregon State Highway Division bought the property around the lighthouse to build a new state park. The park site included the lighthouse, the Coast Guard observation tower, and many acres of forested bluff, ocean dunes and surrounding beaches. It is now the Yaquina Bay State Recreation Area and consists of 32 acres of several day-use areas including hiking trails, picnic areas, fishing, and beach access, and has approximately 1,700,000 visitors per year.

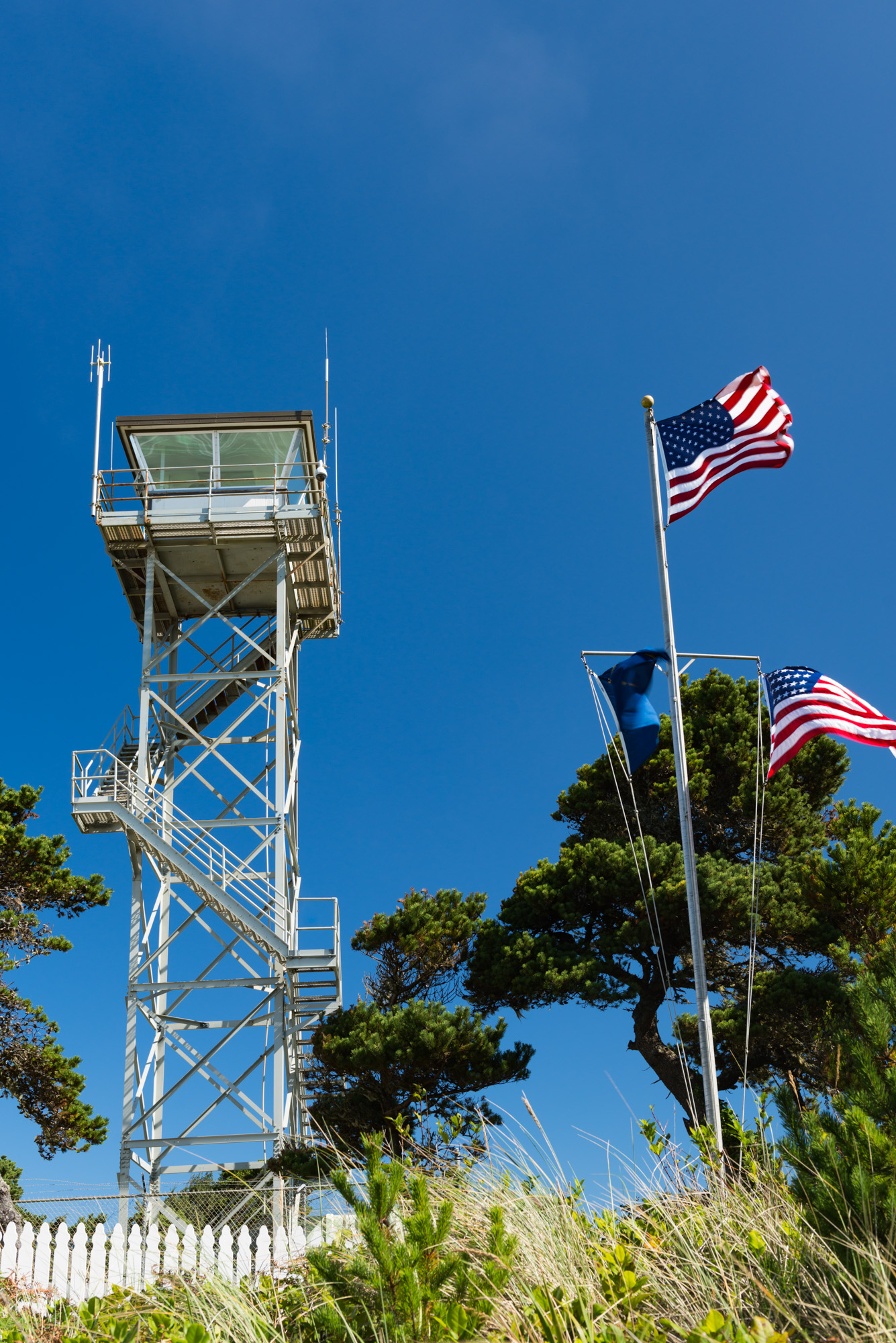
Lookout tower beside lighthouse, 2013.

Sometime later in 1946, the lighthouse was scheduled for demolition, which led to the formation of the Lincoln County Historical Society to save it. They raised money for three years to save the dilapidated structure, and got a delay. But by 1951, demolition was again scheduled. Then, Mr. L. E. Warford, who had recently moved to Newport from Ohio, arranged for the Yaquina Bay Lighthouse to be recognized as a historical site supervised by the Historical Society. It served as a county museum for 18 years until 1970.

The lighthouse was then listed on the National Register of Historic Places in 1970, and restored under the Historic Preservation Act in 1974. At that time, its ownership was transferred to the Oregon Parks and Recreation Department.

The light was re-lit on December 7, 1996, with "a 9.8-inch (250 mm) modern optic, on loan from lighthouse historian James A. Gibbs." The lighthouse is now a privately maintained navigational aid belonging to the U.S. Coast Guard that displays "a fixed white light visible for six miles," and is open for public viewing and tours daily.

The Yaquina Bay structure is the only existing lighthouse in the state in which the living quarters are housed in the same building as the light. Only a few with this arrangement were built on the entire Pacific coast.

The building is reputed to be haunted. The haunting is the subject of a fictional work by a local author called The Lighthouse Ghost Of Yaquina Bay.

== See also ==
- Yaquina Bay State Recreation Site
- List of lighthouses in Oregon
