= Treasure Island Development =

Redevelopment project in San Francisco, USA

Coordinates: 37.825956°N 122.375122°W

Artist's impression of an aerial view of the new Treasure Island development

The Treasure Island Development is a 405-acre (164 ha) major redevelopment project under construction on Treasure Island and parts of Yerba Buena Island in San Francisco Bay between San Francisco and Oakland, within San Francisco city limits. The Treasure Island Development Authority (TIDA) is a nonprofit organization formed to oversee the economic development of the former naval station. The Treasure Island Project is being developed by a joint venture between Lennar and Kenwood Investments. The development is expected to cost US$1.5 billion.

== Treasure Island Development Authority ==
The Treasure Island Development Authority (TIDA) is a nonprofit organization city agency that oversees the economic development of Treasure Island. The Authority has a seven-member Board of Directors who were appointed by the former Mayor of San Francisco, Ed Lee. The Board of Directors oversees the goal of reusing the island in an environmentally and economically viable way, as well as creating and minting the master development plan. The current members of TIDA are:

Name
V. Fei Tsen, President
Linda Fadeke Richardson, Vice President
Mark Dunlop, Secretary & Chief Financial Officer
La'Shawndra Breston
Jeanette Howard
Nabihah Azim
Timothy Reyff
Supervisor Matt Dorsey - Ex-officio

TIDA strives to achieve success in the following goals: "Leadership in Sustainability, Establishing a Regional Destination, Unique San Francisco Neighborhood, Creating Community Benefits/ Job Opportunities"

== Master plan ==
The master plan calls for all residences to be within a 10-minute walk of all basic goods. A new ferry terminal would connect to a retail center as part of an urban core with a 40-story tower and hotels. Three distinct residential neighborhoods would radiate from the core area and feature townhouses, along with flats and a 14-story residential tower. Also proposed are five high-rise towers, a K-8 school, 450,000 sq ft (42,000 m^{2}) of retail and commercial buildings, a 275-acre (111 ha) park, a 20-acre (8.1 ha) organic farm, and a 400-ship marina and beach along with state-of-the-art community facilities. The entire redevelopment would take 20 to 30 years to build and would create 8,000 new households for approximately 20,000 people. The development is expected to cost US$1.5 billion.

=== Buildings in the development ===
Name	Floors
Sun Tower	60
Treasure Island Tower I	40
Treasure Island Tower II	40
Treasure Island Tower III	40
Treasure Island Tower IV	40

== Project status ==
The City of San Francisco and the former San Francisco Redevelopment Agency had planned to redevelop the 404-acre (163-hectare) island since 1997, when the United States Navy closed its base on the island. The Treasure Island Project is being developed by a joint venture between Lennar and Wilson Meany.

On June 7, 2011, the San Francisco Board of Supervisors voted 11-0 to approve the project. The project would create 3,000 permanent jobs, and 2,000 construction jobs. Treasure Island's development was set to break ground during mid-2012. However, on April 12, 2013, The San Francisco Chronicle reported that the deal has collapsed, with the Chinese investors from China Development Bank and China Railway Construction Corporation withdrawing from the project.

To facilitate the project, about 40 households on Yerba Buena Island were evicted in 2015, with two-thirds opted to relocate to Treasure Island. Construction of the large development started in March 2016. In 2019, there were about 1,800 residents who lived in Treasure Island.

On March 1, 2022, daily ferry service between Treasure Island Ferry Terminal and San Francisco Ferry Building was commenced.

Construction of Isle House (also known as Tidal House), which located at Parcel C2.4 in the development area, began in July 2022. The building has 22 floors and 250 apartment units. It was topped out on July 12, 2023. The tower was then opened in September 2024. Upon its completion, it became the first and the tallest high-rise building in Treasure Island.

The first affordable apartment in the development area, Maceo May Apartments, was officially opened on May 18, 2023. The 6-floor building has 105 units and was built solely for veterans. It was then followed by the 7-floor Star View Court, which was opened on October 9, 2024. This apartment has 138 units.

== Criticisms ==
Critics of the project say the island's soil might be toxic because it is a former Navy base. In 2014, Navy contractors dug a small radioactive fragment out of the soil on the island. The land is prone to subsidence and liquefaction in event of an earthquake.

After the city of San Francisco initially approved the project in 2011, a group called "Citizens for a Sustainable Treasure Island", led by then-former city supervisor Aaron Peskin, filed a lawsuit against the city and the developer, out of concern that the project's impact on environment and traffic had not been properly reviewed. The courts rejected the complaint, with the California Supreme Court declining an appeal in October 2014.

== See also ==
- New Urbanism
- Smart Growth
- San Francisco Transbay development
- San Francisco Redevelopment Agency

== External links and further reading ==
- Treasure Island official website at the City and County of San Francisco
- Information about the development from the SF Office of Economic and Workforce Development
- "Plan for Treasure Island Clears Hurdle, but Serious Issues Remain" article by Zusha Elinson in The New York Times April 23, 2011
- Through two mayors, connected island developers cultivated profitable deal Public Press 2010
- Specter of conflict of interest for Newsom / Developer, fund-raiser seeks Treasure Island deal SFGate 2004
- Treasure Island Trouble Has Grand Jury Writing Mad / Report takes special slam at S.F. mayor SFGATE 1998
