= USS Pandemonium =

United States Navy training ship

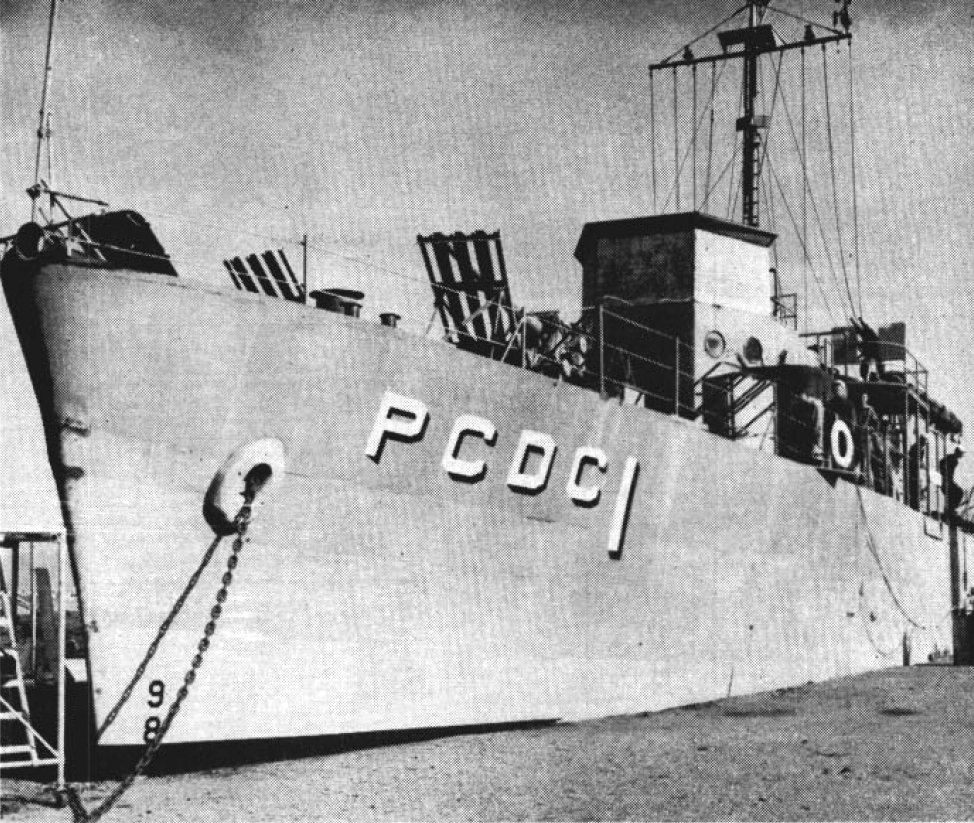
- USS Pandemonium (PCDC-1) in 1957.

History

United States
- Name: USS Pandemonium
- Owner: Naval Station Treasure Island
- Operator: United States Navy
- Ordered: November 1955
- Builder: Biological and Chemical Warfare Defense School Treasure Island
- Christened: 1 February 1957
- Out of service: 1992
- Identification: Hull number PCDC-1
- Fate: Demolished 1996

General characteristics
- Length: 173 ft (53 m)
- Beam: 24 ft (7.3 m)
- Propulsion: None

USS Pandemonium (hull number PCDC-1) was a full-scale mockup of a PC-461-class submarine chaser built by the United States Navy at Naval Station Treasure Island on Treasure Island, San Francisco. The purpose of the mockup was training personnel in atomic-biological-chemical warfare, specifically for training in nuclear fallout decontamination and radiation monitoring procedures. The ship was described by the Navy as "one of the most realistic training aids" for atomic-biological-chemical warfare.

== Construction ==
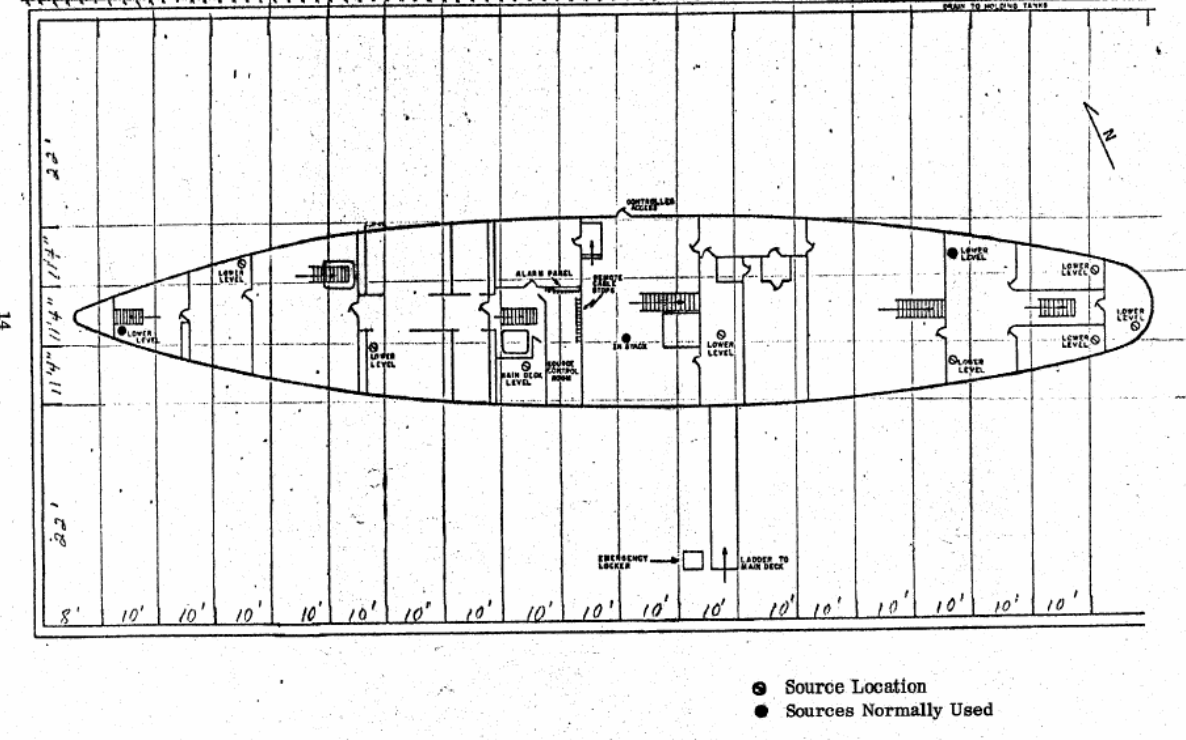
Plan view of the USS Pandemonium showing the eleven cesium source locations.

Construction of the USS Pandemonium began in late 1955 using funding from the Bureau of Ships. It was assembled by the Biological and Chemical Warfare Defense School of Naval Station Treasure Island using refurbished parts from various scrapped ships from salvage units at Mare Island Naval Shipyard, San Francisco Naval Shipyard, and Oakland Naval Supply Center. Plans for the USS Kelso (originally USS PC-1170) and photographs of other PC-461-class submarine chasers were used as the basis for construction.

The ship was built on a large concrete slab in a 400-by-600-foot (120 by 180 m) gravel-covered lot on the northwestern section of Treasure Island (now called Site I). To create a realistic training environment, electrical systems, sound-powered telephones, and fire mitigation systems were installed throughout, and eleven tubes were installed at various locations in the mockup which would later hold the radioactive cesium-137 sources that were during training activities. The ship was christened on February 1, 1957, and the name Pandemonium was chosen as it described the state of the ship's decks after a simulated enemy attack. It was reported after construction that "practically every metalworking specialist passing through the Receiving Station since construction began [had] worked a little on the PC."

== Activities ==
=== Site I ===
Radiological decontamination training on the Pandemonium (1957 or 1958).

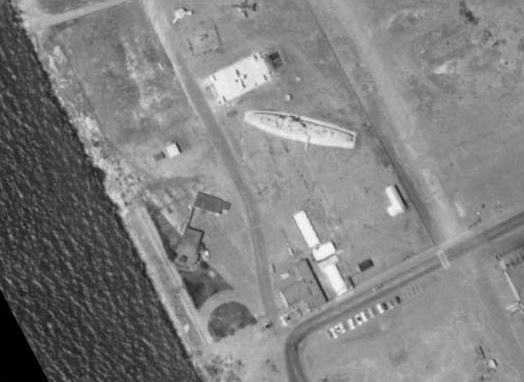
Aerial photograph of the Pandemonium at Site I (1969).

Training aboard the Pandemonium consisted of radiation monitoring and decontamination drills. The ship had eleven locations where sealed cesium-137 radiation sources could be raised out of lead shielded tubes by an instructor, and each cesium source had a radioactivity content of 0.65 curies. The radiation from the sources were intended to accurately model the radiation exposure that sailors would experience after a ship was covered in fallout from a thermonuclear bomb detonation. Trainees would practice locating those sources using radiac detectors. Training courses using the USS Pandemonium each took six weeks and participants were exposed to up to 300 millirem of radiation per week.

By the time personnel were being trained for the Operation Hardtack I and Hardtack II series of nuclear tests of 1958, a second system had been installed to spray large surfaces of the Pandemonium with short-lived radioactive isotopes; this would more accurately simulate radioactive fallout than individual cesium sources. For this purpose, the Atomic Energy Commission authorized the use of bromine-80, bromine-82, sodium-24, and potassium-42. A water tank was built near the Pandemonium to hold a solution of bromine-82, a radioactive isotope with a half-life of approximately 35 hours (the other permitted isotopes were not used on the Pandemonium). The hull was doused with this solution using the spray system, then trainees would scrub it clean. Initially the only measure taken to prevent the discharge of contaminated radioactive water created by this process directly into San Francisco Bay was to block the in-ground inlets to old stormwater sewers that ran under Site I; the contaminated water was allowed to seep into the gravel bed of the site. By the end of 1963, the Navy had built two storage tanks to collect the contaminated water and allow sufficient time for the radioactive materials to decay to safe levels before discharging the water into the bay.

=== Site II ===
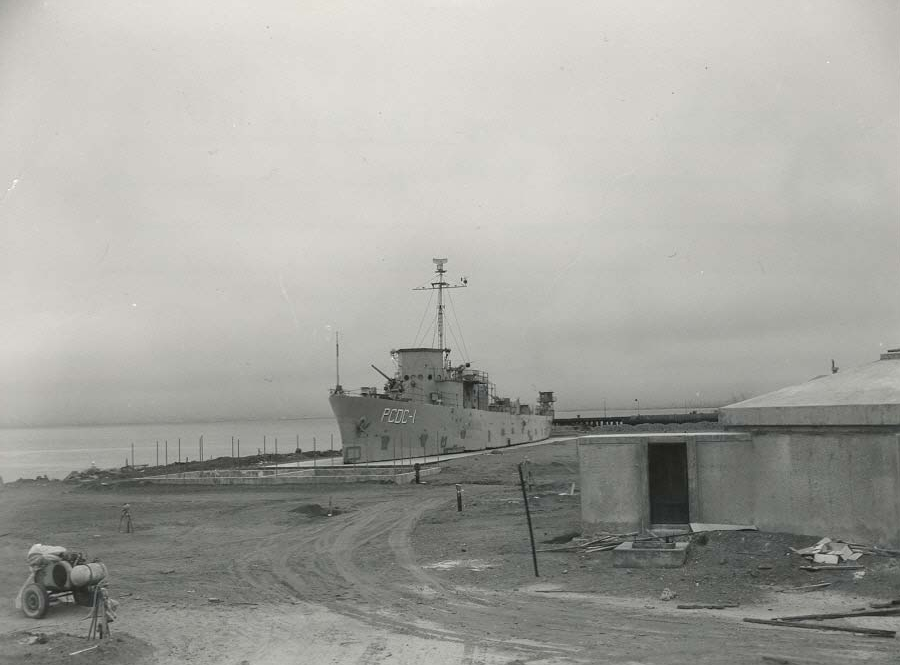
USS Pandemonium at Site II (1970).

From May 1969 to September 1970, the USS Pandemonium was dismantled, moved, and reassembled at the northeastern corner of Treasure Island (now called Site II), adjacent to what is now the island’s sewage treatment plant. It was refurbished to be part of the Damage Control School Treasure Island, and was co-located with the Damage Control School's tear gas training building. The area of Site I was demolished and several housing units for members of the military with families were constructed on the site.

The use of bromine-82 training for fallout decontamination ceased in 1972, but decontamination and radiation monitoring training continued at Site II until at least 1979, by which time all but one cesium source had been removed from the mockup. From the time the mockup ceased to be used as a training aid until 1986, the mockup and surrounding area were used for storage of PCB-laden transformers and other hazardous waste. Use of the Pandemonium ended in 1992 when it was placed in permanent layup in anticipation of the 1993 Base Realignment and Closure of Naval Station Treasure Island. In 1996, the USS Pandemonium was disassembled, removed from Treasure Island, and sold for scrap, leaving only the concrete foundation and holding tanks.

== Environmental impact ==
Site I and Site II are radiologically and chemically contaminated, and the US Navy has been criticized for its ongoing remediation and decontamination efforts on Treasure Island. Local reporters stated that the Navy contractor dumped the remains of the Pandemonium in an undisclosed landfill, then released the site without performing necessary radiation surveys. Despite a reportedly inadequate release of the island, the 2006 radiological assessment of Treasure Island determined that Site I and Site II were not radiologically impacted. This was criticized as a "radiological lie" by a local news outlet. Multiple discoveries of radioactive material in "clean" areas occurred between 2006 and 2011, including shards of metal with radium contamination at the location of Site I in 2008. These incidents, along with reports from California State health officials, prompted a second radiological assessment in 2014. The 2014 radiological assessment determined that both Site I and Site II are radiologically impacted based on suspected contamination resulting from unlicensed radioactivity survey instruments containing check sources made with radium-226 and failure to comply with procedures regarding leak checking of licensed check sources.

At Site I (now a residential area with low-income housing), the soil was found to contain PAH and PCB contamination at 19,000 ppm, exceeding the legal maximum of 0.22 ppm. Contaminants in the area of Site I, including lead, arsenic, and DDT, have been identified in the soil as recently as 2023. In March 2010, the soil around Site II was completely removed to a depth of 12 feet (4 m) to remove 790 tons of soil contaminated with PCBs, dioxins, heavy metals, pesticides, and petroleum products. The soil removal was not related to the training activities aboard the Pandemonium, but instead from PCB spills that occurred while transformers were stored on and around the ship. This soil removal had the effect of destroying the concrete foundation, leaving only the bromine-water holding tanks. Because the soil removal occurred before the second radiological assessment in 2014 which determined Site II was radiologically impacted, radioactive isotopes were not considered chemicals of concern during the removal.
