= Treasure Island, San Francisco =

Artificial island in San Francisco Bay, California, US

Treasure Island Magic Isle
- Landform and neighborhood
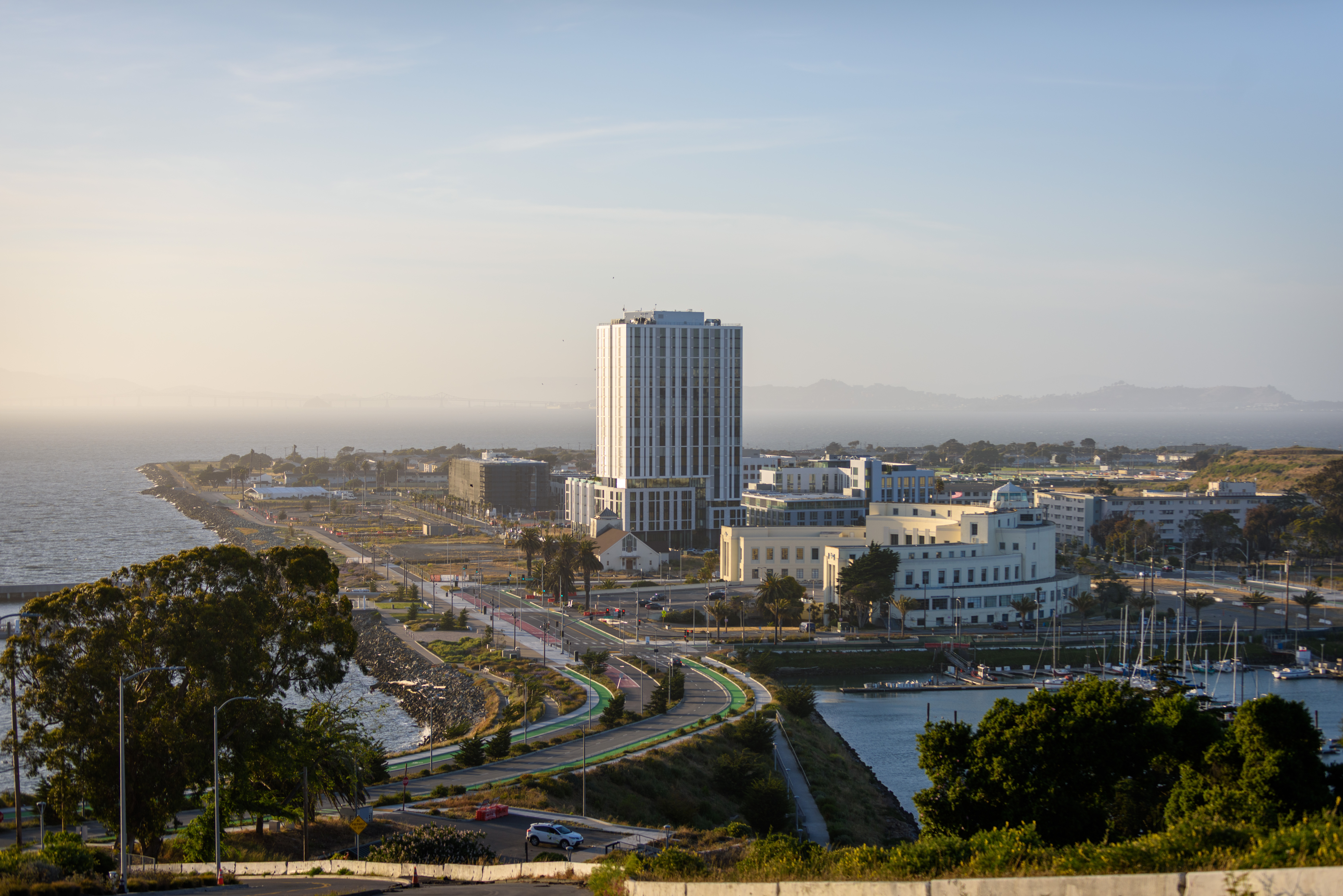
- The western side of Treasure Island as seen from Yerba Buena Island. Faintly visible in the distance are the Richmond–San Rafael Bridge and Brickyard Cove.

- Treasure Island is the northernmost area of San Francisco's District 6

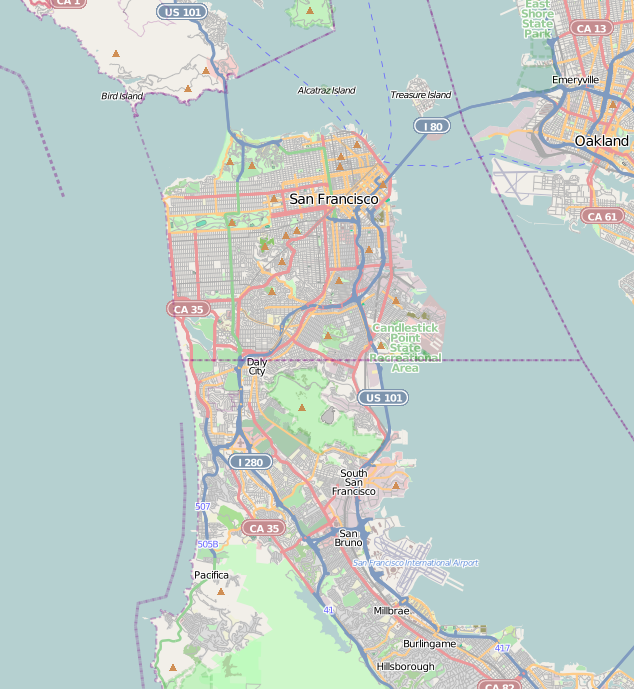
- Location within San Francisco
- Coordinates: 37.825°N 122.371°W
- Country: United States
- State: California
- City-county: San Francisco
- Constructed: 1936–37
- Named for: Treasure Island (novel)

Government
  - Supervisor: Matt Dorsey (Dist. 6)
  - Assemblymember: Matt Haney (D)
  - State senator: Scott Wiener (D)
  - U. S. rep.: Nancy Pelosi (D)

Area
  - Total: 0.9 sq mi (2.3 km^{2})
  - Land: 0.9 sq mi (2.3 km^{2})
  - Water: 0 sq mi (0 km^{2}) 0%

Population (2024 estimate)
  - Total: 2,800
  - Density: 3,100/sq mi (1,200/km^{2})
- Time zone: UTC-8 (Pacific)
  - Summer (DST): UTC-7 (PDT)
- ZIP Code: 94130
- Area codes: 415/628
- GNIS feature IDs: 236528 (island); 2624152 (Building 157); 2506912 (Job Corps Ctr)
- Wikimedia Commons: Treasure Island, California
- Website: Treasure Island Development Authority

California Historical Landmark
- Reference no.: 987

Treasure Island is a man-made island in San Francisco Bay, and a neighborhood in the City and County of San Francisco. Built in 1936–37 for the 1939 Golden Gate International Exposition, the island was named by Clyde Milner Vandeburg, part of the Fair's public relations team. Its World's Fair site is a California Historical Landmark. Buildings there have been listed on the National Register of Historic Places, and the historical Naval Station Treasure Island, an auxiliary air facility (for airships, blimps, dirigibles, planes and seaplanes), are designated in the Geographic Names Information System. Treasure Island is connected to Yerba Buena Island, another (natural) auxiliary island of San Francisco, by a causeway, creating access to Interstate 80.

== Geography ==
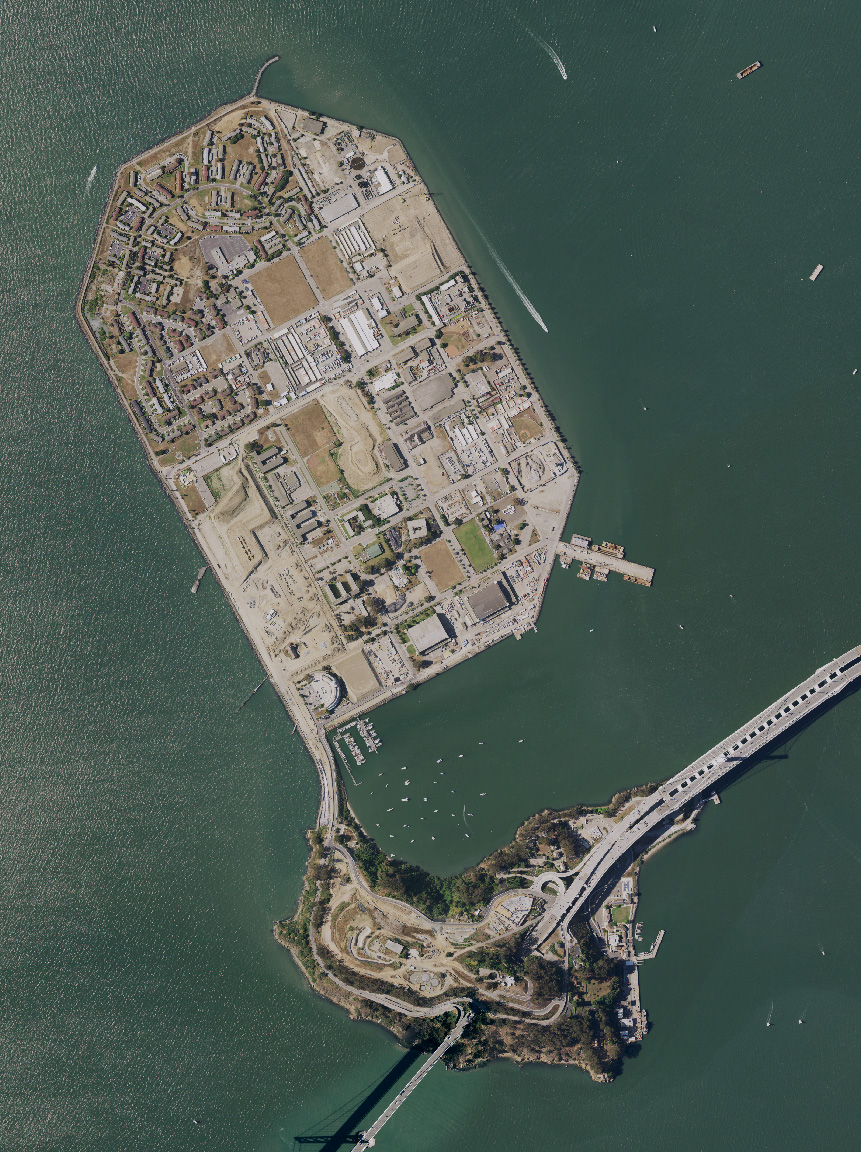
Aerial view of Treasure Island (top) and Yerba Buena Island (bottom)

The San Francisco census tract that includes Treasure Island extends up and down San Francisco Bay and includes a small uninhabited tip of western Alameda Island. Yerba Buena and Treasure Island together have a land area of 576.7 acres (233.4 ha) with – in 2010 – a total population of 2,500. Treasure Island alone is 393 acres. It is connected by a 900 ft (270 m) causeway to Yerba Buena Island, which in turn has on- and off-ramps to Interstate 80 on the San Francisco–Oakland Bay Bridge.

The island has a marina and a bikeway connecting to the Eastern span replacement of the San Francisco–Oakland Bay Bridge. Raised walkways circumscribe nearly the entire island along five streets (Avenue of the Palms, Perimeter Road, Avenue N, Pan American World Airways Esplanade and Clipper Cove Way, formerly known as 1st Street).

== History ==
Prior to the island's construction by the United States government, "Yerba Buena Shoals" of rock north of the transbay island had less than 27 ft (8.2 m) clearance and were a shipping hazard. The 400-acre (1.6 km^{2}) island was constructed by emplacing 287,000 short tons (260,000 t) of quarried rock in the shoals for the island/causeway perimeter rock walls (a freshwater reservoir was quarried in the rock of Yerba Buena Island). Approximately 23 feet (7.0 m) of dredged bay sand filled the interior, was mitigated from salt, and then 50,000 cubic yards (38,000 m^{3}) topsoil was used for planting 4,000 trees, 70,000 shrubs, and 700,000 flowering plants. Facility construction had begun by March 4, 1937, when two hangars were being built.

External media

Images
- World's Fair montage with tower

Video
- World's Fair films (YouTube)

On February 18, 1939, the 'Magic City' opened with a "walled city" of several fair ground courts: a central Court of Honor, a Court of the East, a Port of Trade Winds on the south and on the north: a Court of Pacifica, a 12,000-car parking lot, and the adjacent National Building, the $1.5M Federal Building, the Hall of Western States, the $800K administration building, various exhibit halls for industries (e.g., "Machinery, Science, and Vacationland"), and two 335-by-78-foot (102 m × 24 m) hangars planned for post-exposition use by Pan Am Airways flying boats (notably the China Clipper) that would use the Port of Trade Winds Harbor (later referred to as Clipper Cove) between the two islands. In addition to Building 2 (Hangar 2) and Building 3 (Hangar 3), remaining exposition buildings include Building 1 (Streamline Moderne architecture) intended after the expo as the Pan Am terminal. The expo's Magic Carpet Great Lawn also remains.

A couplet from the song "Lydia the Tattooed Lady", in the Marx Brothers' 1939 film, At The Circus, reads "Here is Grover Whalen unveilin' the Trylon/Over on the West Coast we have Treasure Island", citing, in the Trylon and Treasure Island, two prominent features of international civic events happening that year (as the 1939 New York World's Fair vied for tourist patrons with the Golden Gate International Expo).

Treasure Island and the exposition are featured in one of James A. Fitzpatrick's Technicolor travel features, "Night Descends on Treasure Island", released in 1940.

=== Military base ===
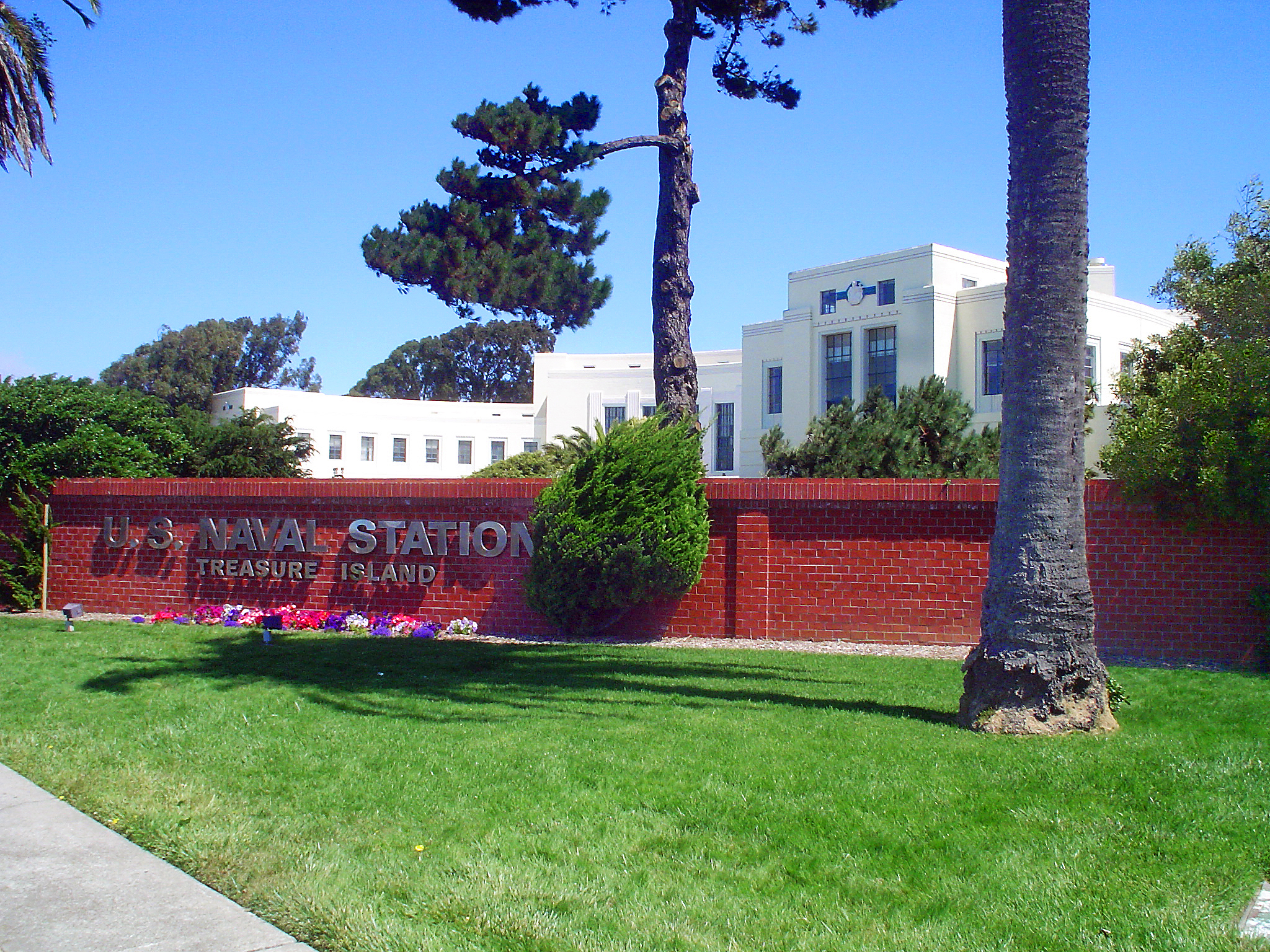
Headquarters Building at U.S. Naval Station Treasure Island

Treasure Island was originally intended to become a second airport for San Francisco, augmenting the existing San Francisco Municipal Airport, now SFO. But with war looming, the Navy moved in.

Naval Station (NAVSTA) Treasure Island began under a 1941 war lease as a United States Navy "reception center". On April 17, 1942, the U.S. Navy cut short an ownership dispute with the city by seizing the island. The Navy eventually compensated the city with $10 million in improvements to the existing airport, including reclaiming 93 acres of land, and postwar ownership of all military improvements. (A widely cited Navy report gave rise to the urban legend that the Navy swapped the island for land on which the city then built SFO. In fact, the airport had been operating in its current location since 1927.)

NAVSTA Treasure Island had a Naval Auxiliary Air Facility in order to support helicopters, fixed wing planes, seaplanes, blimps, dirigibles and airships and a U.S.Navy/USMC electronics school. During World War II over 12,000 men a day were processed here for Pacific area assignments, and thousands more were processed for separation in the aftermath of the war. The psychiatric ward of the naval base at Treasure Island was used to study and experiment on naval sailors who were being discharged for being homosexual.

Since before the 1950s and through the 1990s (throughout both Korean & Vietnam wars), the U.S. Navy's Naval Technical Training Center (NTTC) – Treasure Island, was operational. Multiple Maintenance Skills were part of the curriculum there, including training of Electronic Technicians (ET) in Radiation and Detection equipment (RADIAC), Communications & Radar systems, as well as training of Shipfitter and Damage Control Technicians, which also covered Nuclear Biological & Chemical (NBC) Warfare Decontamination (DECON) techniques. In 1972, a new U.S. Navy rate, consisting of the old Shipfitter and Damage Control Technician ratings, was created. This new U.S. Navy rate was Hull Maintenance Technician (HT). The Navy later realized that Damage Control was such a large responsibility that it needed a rating specifically tasked with those duties, hence the reemergence of the Damage Controlman Rating in 1988.

In recognition of his naval base leadership and development efforts since the inception of U.S. Naval Station Treasure Island, Rear Admiral Hugo Wilson Osterhaus Square was established in front of Building 1 Administration Building, Treasure Island. Medal of Honor and Navy Cross recipient USMC Gunnery Sgt John Basilone movie theatre Building 401 @ 680 Avenue I was established in recognition as being one of the earliest World War II heroes.

The station was identified by the 1991 Base Realignment and Closure Commission, and NAVSTA Treasure Island closed in 1997. Remaining military structures included Bldg. 600 @ 750 Avenue M (former Naval Firefighting School, now SFFD's Treasure Island Training Facility & Temporary SFFD Fire Station 48), Bldg. 157 (Navy Fire station 2 built circa 1942 wood-frame building which lacks modern earthquake Seismic retrofit) @ 849 Avenue D (SFFD Station 48 closed March 7, 2014, due to health hazards and excessive deferred maintenance), and the 20,000 sq ft (1,900 m^{2}) Bldg. 180 by U.S. Naval Station Way and California Ave (now a winery).

==== SAC radar station ====
The Treasure Island Radar Bomb Scoring Site (call sign San Francisco Bomb Plot) was a Strategic Air Command (SAC) automatic tracking radar facility established on the island. Major Posey was the c. 1948 commander of Detachment B (Capt Carlson on August 1, 1949) which evaluated simulated bombing missions on targets in the San Francisco metropolitan area for maintaining Cold War bomber crews' proficiency. A nearby "Stockton Bomb Plot (Det I)" moved to Charlotte in 1950, and the Treasure Island unit was redesignated Detachment 13 in 1951, the year 3 other SAC detachments used a nearby staging/preparation area for deploying via the bay for Korean War ground-directed bombing (cf. the Sacramento Bomb Plot at a McClellan AFB Annex in 1951.) On October 16, 1951, Treasure Island's Det 13 was assigned under March AFB's 3933rd Radar Bomb Scoring Squadron before moving from the island by August 10, 1954, when the 11th RBS Squadron was activated.

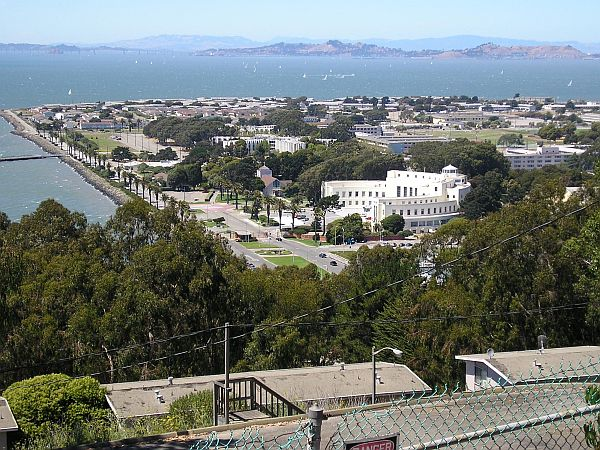
Treasure Island beyond Yerba Buena Island's rooftops and trees, which obscure the causeway and marina. The large curved white building (right of center) is the Administration Building (Building 1) which housed the island's museum 1976–97 (the museum association's offices returned in 2008.)

=== Film stages and settings ===
From the late 1980s, Treasure Island's old aircraft Hangar 2 (Building 2) and Hangar 3 (Building 3) served as sound stages for film-making and TV, e.g., The Matrix ("bullet time" visual effect), Rent, and The Pursuit of Happyness. Treasure Island was a film setting of the 1939 Charlie Chan at Treasure Island, 1989 Indiana Jones and the Last Crusade (Berlin airport scene), 1995 Copycat (private compound), 1997 Flubber, 1998 What Dreams May Come, 1998 Patch Adams, 1998 The Parent Trap and 1999 Bicentennial Man. An establishing shot of the 1954 The Caine Mutiny shows the main gate and Administration Bldg 1 to indicate the location of the fictitious court martial. For two years from seasons 3 to 5, Treasure Island served as the site of the Battlebots TV show. The offices and penthouse apartment sets in Nash Bridges were located on the island during the show's production (1996–2001). The island was featured as the base of operations for the prototypers in the 2008 Discovery Channel series Prototype This!. Building 180 (warehouse) and Building 111 (former firehouse) on Treasure Island served as film settings for an NBC series titled Trauma. In 2018, Treasure Island Museum building served as a mental hospital setting for the Netflix series titled The OA. MythBusters also regularly shot footage of their various experiments on the island.

=== Remediation and redevelopment ===
Cleanup crews spent several weeks cleaning the island's coast from the 2007 Cosco Busan oil spill just a few hundred yards from Treasure Island, and in 2009 the Navy agreed to sell the island to the city for $105 million as part of a redevelopment project. The federal government's Job Corps maintains an active presence on the 40 acres (16 ha) and 13 building facilities it took over just after the US Navy vacated the island, an area that is not part of the redevelopment. The Administration Building (Bldg. 1) and Hall of Transportation (Bldg. 2) were listed in the National Register of Historic Places in 2008. On June 8, 2011, the San Francisco Board of Supervisors approved new neighborhood development for 19,000 people over the next 20–30 years by Wilson Meany Sullivan, Lennar Urban, and Kenwood Investments. The 2012–2014 US$1.5 billion Treasure Island Development project for up to 8,000 new residences, 140,000 ft^{2} (13,000 m^{2}) of new commercial and retail space, 100,000 ft^{2} (9,300 m^{2}) of new office space, 3 hotels, new Fire station and 300 acres (120 ha) of parks. The island's gas station pumps and canopy were also removed (the island has a high risk of soil liquefaction and tsunami damage in an earthquake). All island natural gas, electricity, sewer and water utilities are serviced by the San Francisco Public Utilities Commission. The island experiences several power outages per year. Ground broke on the island's ferry terminal in 2019.

By December 2010, Navy contractors had removed 16,000 yd^{3} (12,000 m^{3}) of contaminated dirt from the site, "some with radiation levels 400 times the Environmental Protection Agency’s human exposure limits for topsoil." The contaminated dirt is to be replaced by dirt removed during construction of the fourth Caldecott Tunnel bore. In April 2013, caesium-137 levels three times higher than previously recorded were found (the island hosted "radioactive ships from Bikini Atoll atomic tests and [was] a major education center training personnel for nuclear war"—the USS Pandemonium (PCDC-1) mockup had begun nuclear training in 1957.

== Parks ==
The parks and open space plan for Treasure Island and nearby Yerba Buena Island will create approximately 290 acres of open space and parks.

== Education ==
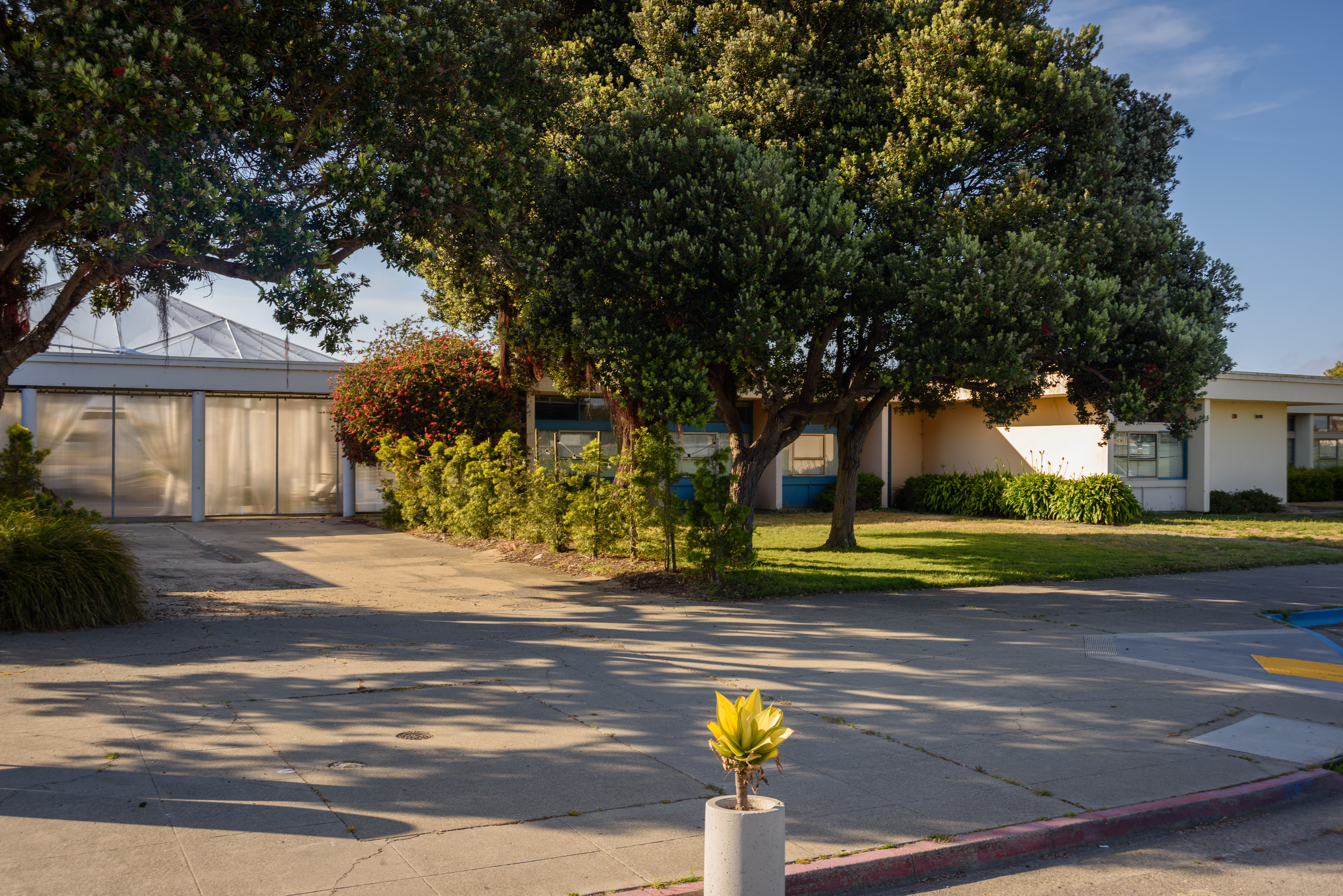
Former Treasure Island Elementary School

The island is a part of the San Francisco Unified School District (SFUSD). Zoned elementary schools serving sections of the island include John Yehall Chin (North Beach) and Sherman (Marina).

SFUSD previously operated Treasure Island K-8 School. In Spring 2004, the SFUSD board voted to close the middle school portion but keep the elementary school in operation. In its final semester of operation, it had 95 students. In December 2004, the district voted to close altogether effective the beginning of 2005. Initially, the Treasure Island Homeless Development Initiative fought to save the school, but after discipline and staffing issues occurred in 2004, the group stopped its efforts. Heather Knight of the San Francisco Chronicle wrote that year "Even people who had fought to save the school earlier this year now admit it's no longer worth saving."

There is a charter school, Life Learning Academy.

== Gallery ==
Looking north towards the Marin Headlands from the western shore.

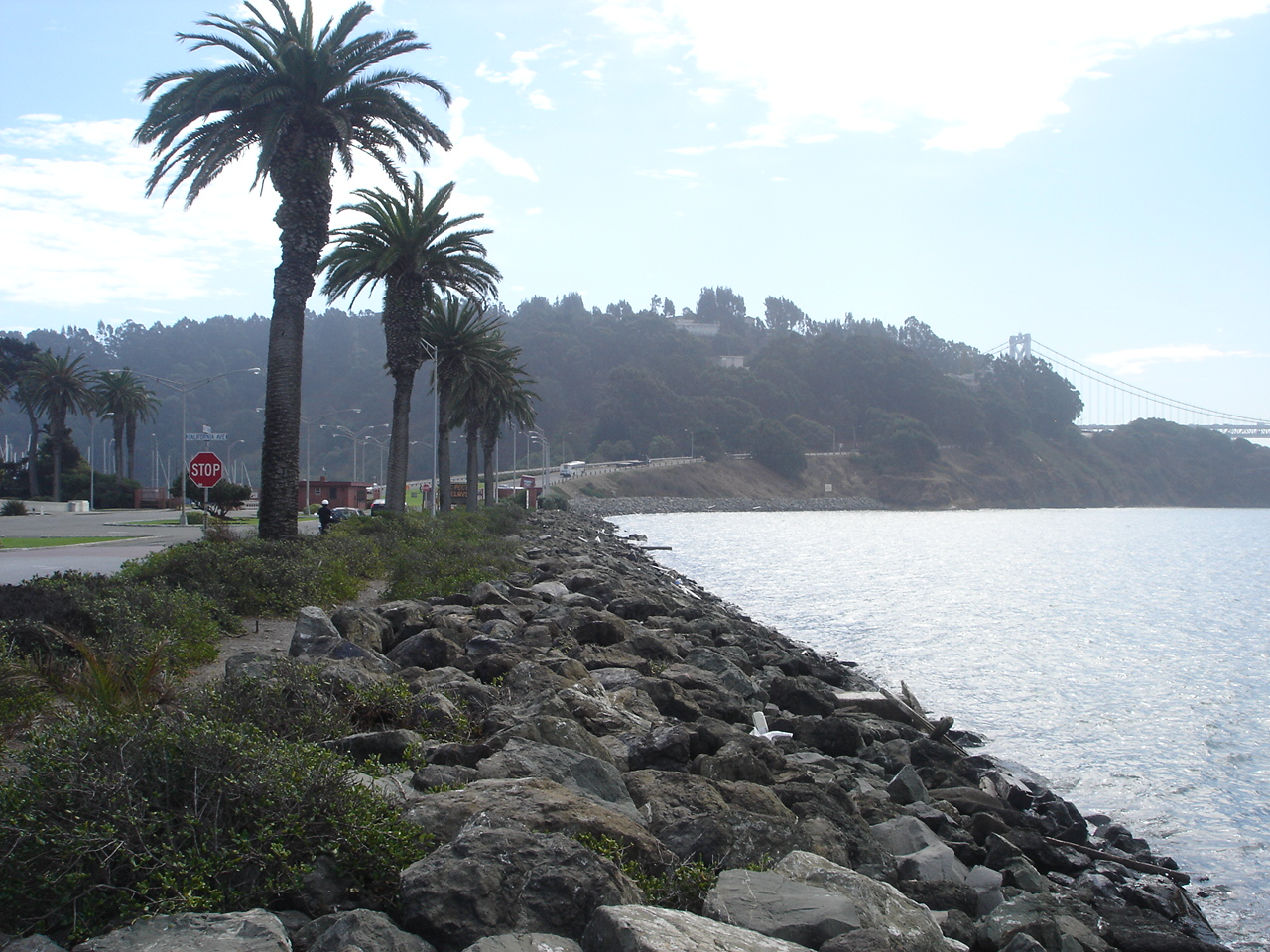
Looking south towards Yerba Buena Island and the Bay Bridge from the western shore.

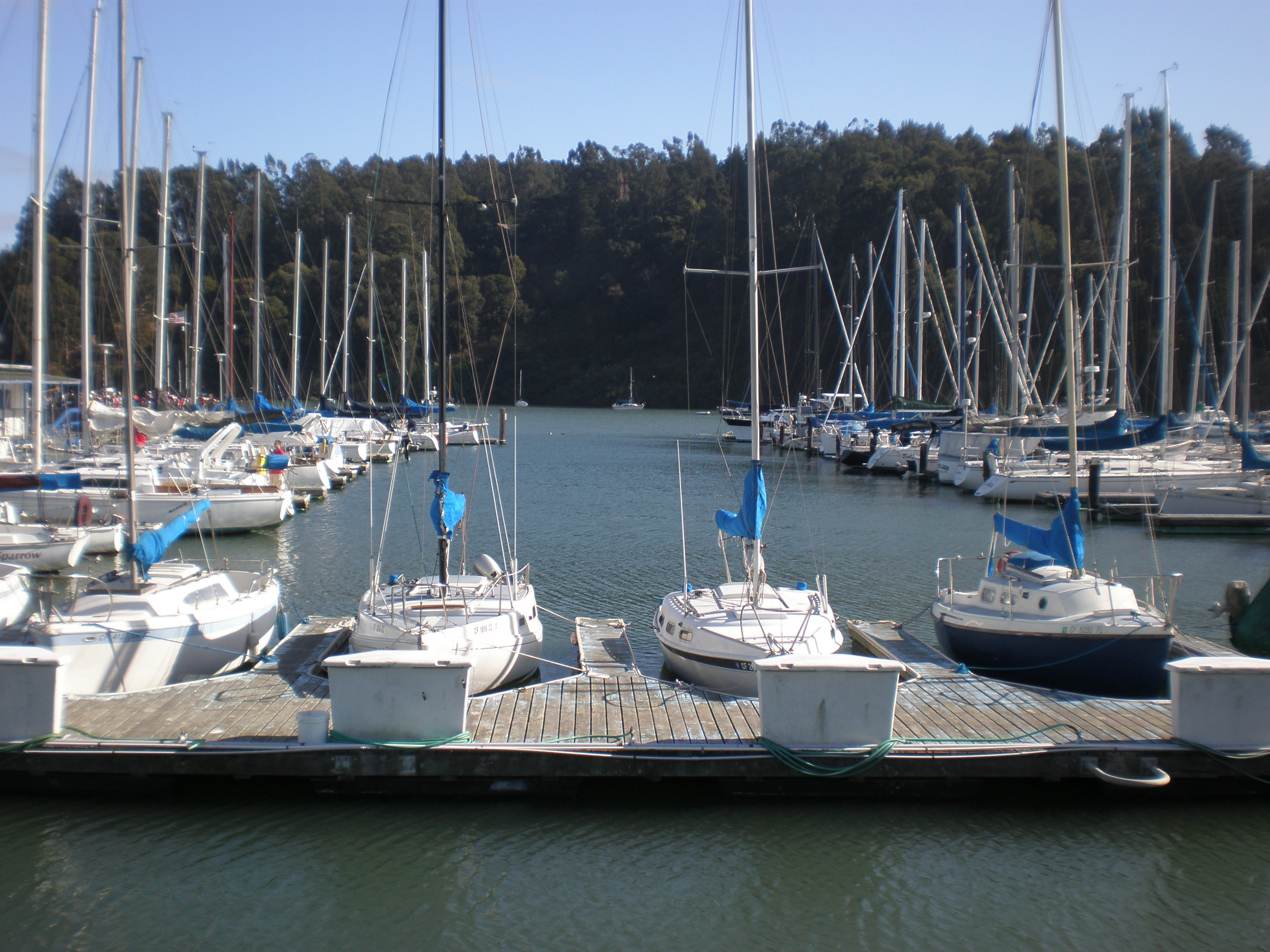
Treasure Island Marina on the island's south shore

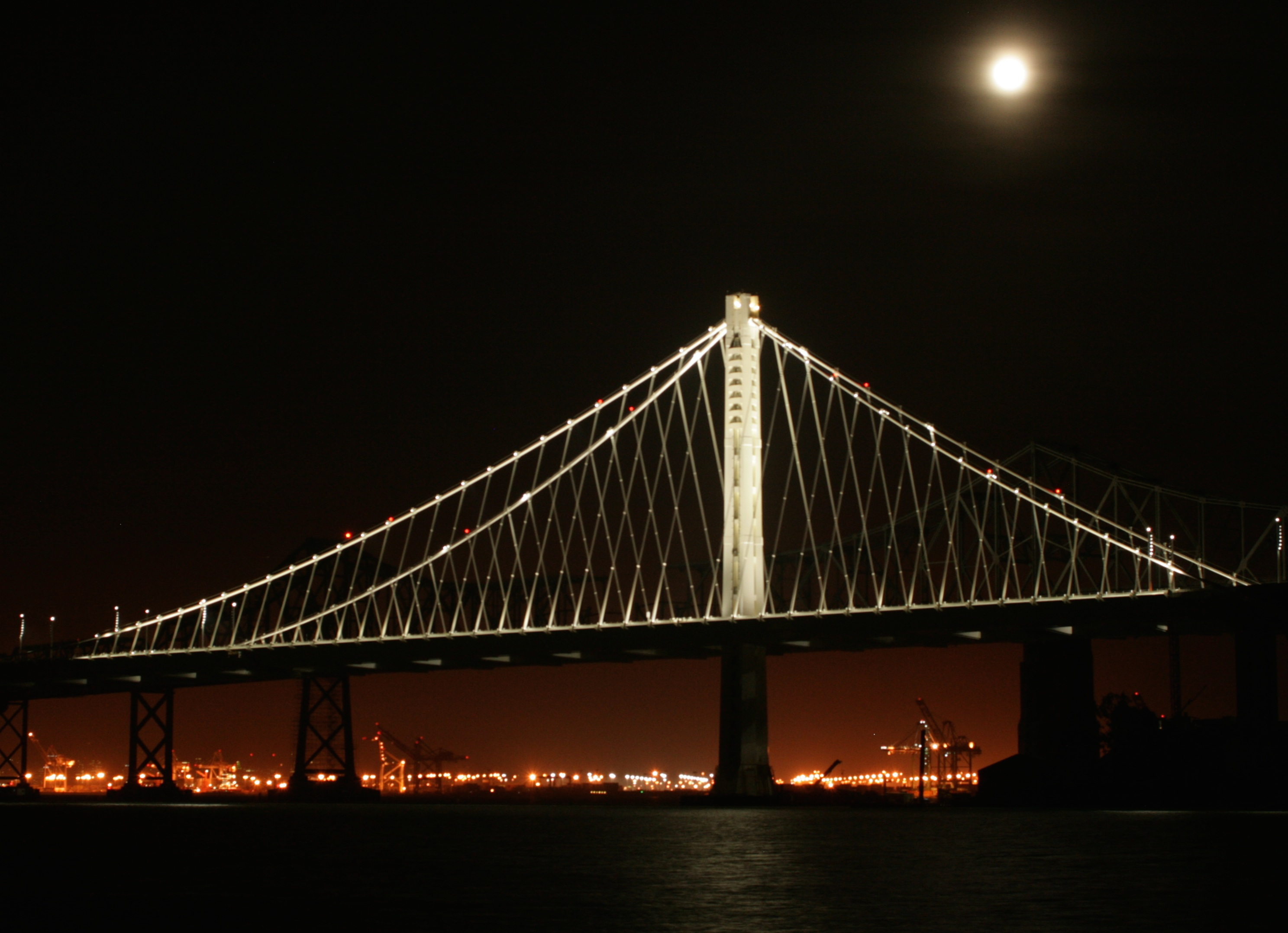
The bridge's new eastern span is best viewed from near the marina

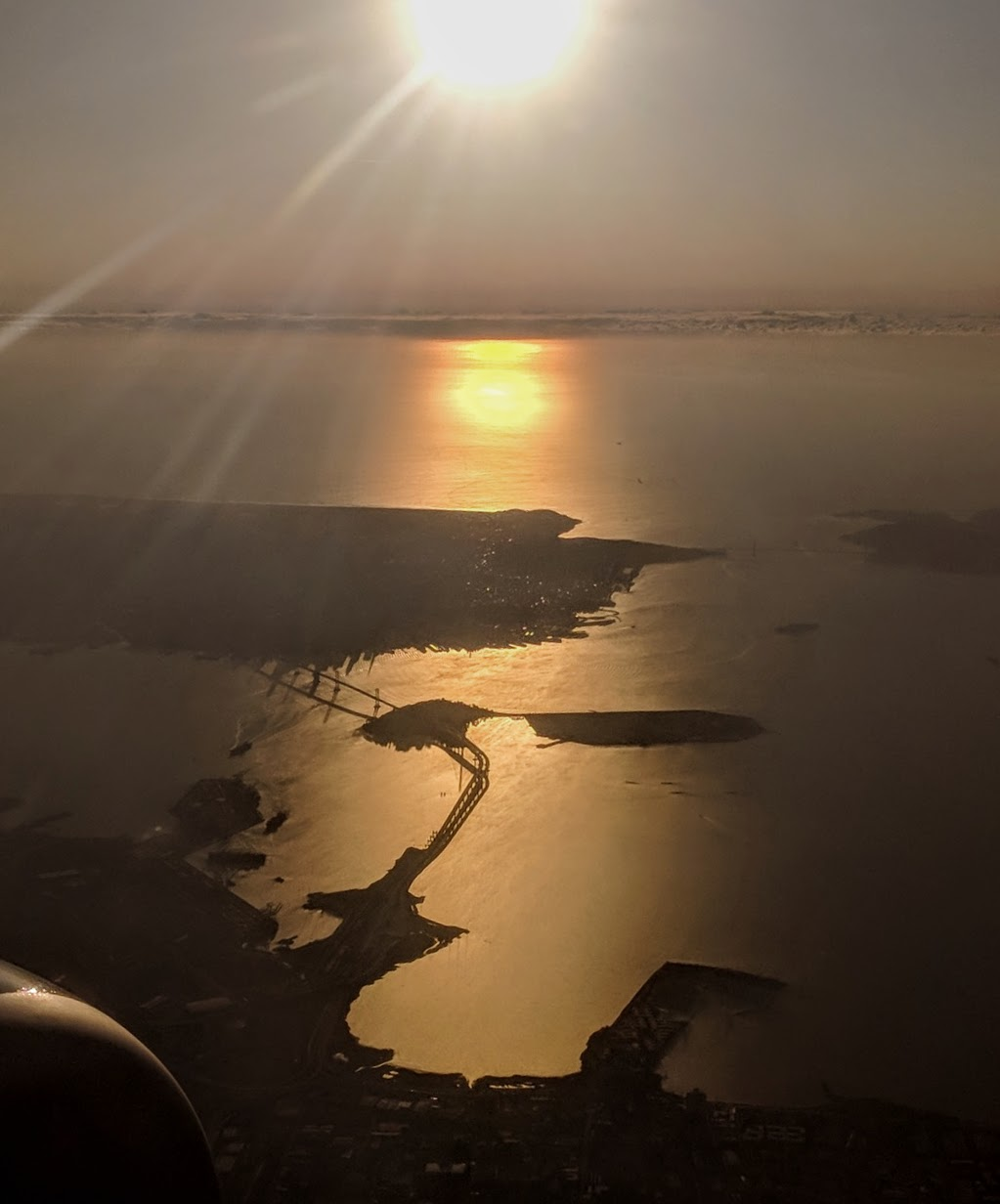
The San Francisco–Oakland Bay Bridge, Yerba Buena Island, Treasure Island, and San Francisco, in an afternoon aerial view looking into the sun

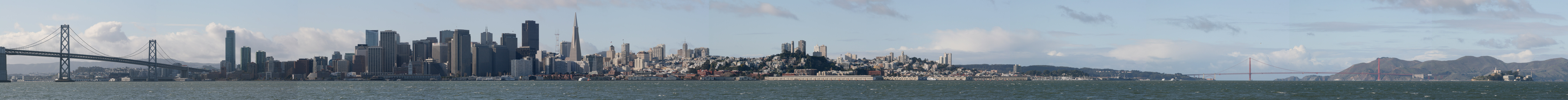
With good weather, the island offers views of San Francisco

== See also ==
- Naval Station Treasure Island
- Treasure Island Development
