= Treasure Island Ferry Terminal =

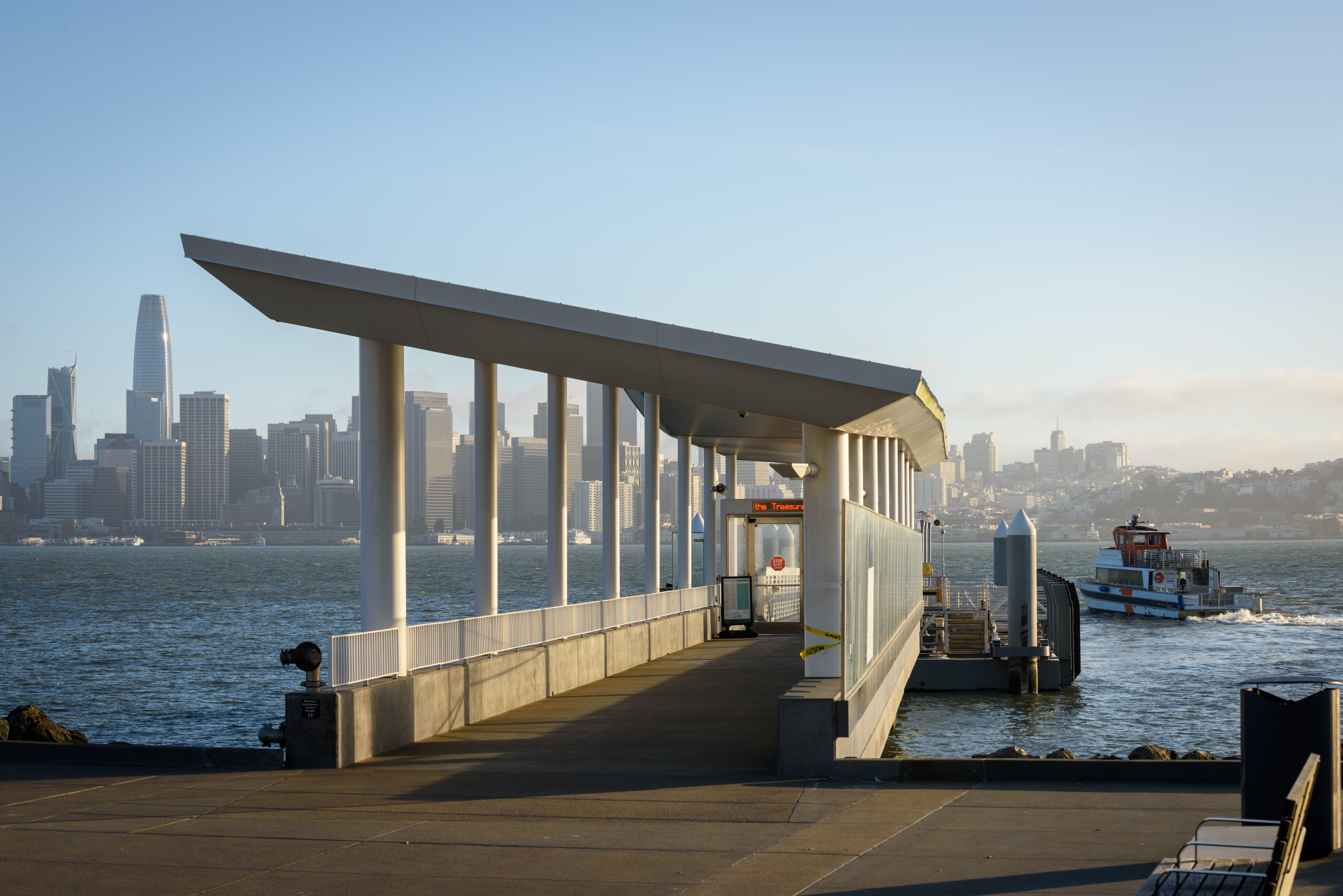
- A ferry pulls away from the terminal

General information
- Location: Treasure Island Road and California Avenue; Treasure Island, San Francisco, California
- Coordinates: 37°49′00″N 122°22′20″W
- Connections: Muni: 25

Construction
- Accessible: Yes

Other information
- Website: tisf.com

History
- Opened: March 1, 2022
Location

Treasure Island Ferry Terminal is a ferry terminal on Treasure Island, San Francisco adjacent to the Administration Building. Treasure Island Community Development began construction of the terminal in 2019 in anticipation of the island's redevelopment with new homes and residents. Ferries operate daily between the San Francisco Ferry Building and the Treasure Island terminal and are operated by Prop SF. The terminal was expected to open in 2021, but officially opened on March 1, 2022, with the start of daily service.
