= Administration Building, Treasure Island =

- U.S. National Register of Historic Places
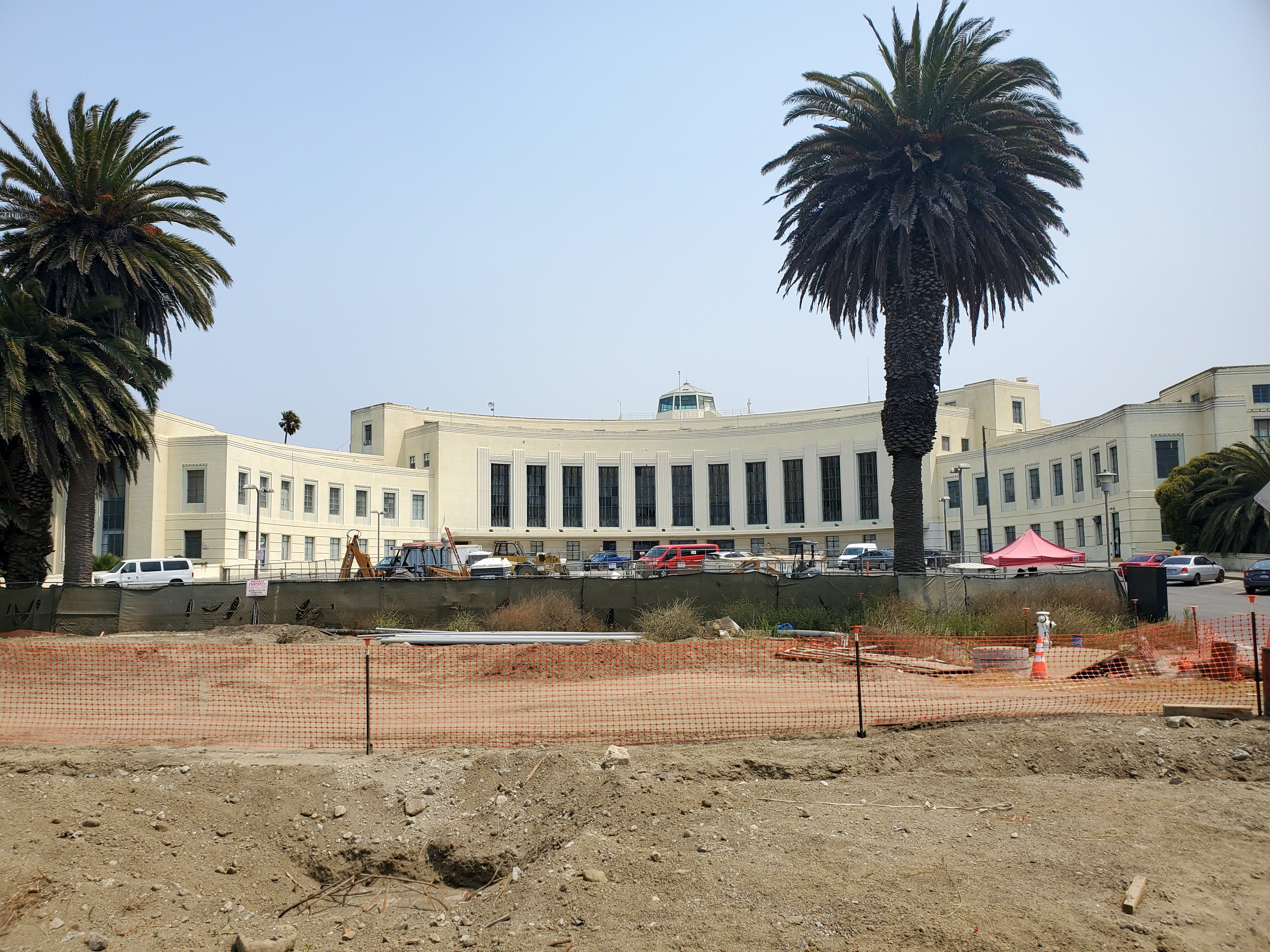
- The Administration Building in August 2021
- Location: 1 Avenue of the Palms; Treasure Island, San Francisco
- Coordinates: 37°49′1″N 122°22′13″W
- Area: 2 acres (0.81 ha)
- Built: 1938; 88 years ago
- Architects: Day, William Peyton; Kelham, George William
- Architectural style: Moderne, Art Deco
- NRHP reference No.: 08000081
- Added to NRHP: February 26, 2008

The Administration Building, Treasure Island, on Treasure Island, California, is a Moderne style building designed by William Peyton Day and George William Kelham. It has also been known as Building 1, as Command Naval Base San Francisco Headquarters, and as Naval Station Treasure Island. It was listed on the National Register of Historic Places in 2008.

Construction began in 1937 with landfill and site preparation, and was completed in 1938. During the Golden Gate International Exposition the building functioned as the terminal for Pan American Airways China Clipper transpacific flying boat service. The United States Navy took over Treasure Island when the exposition ended and rather than continue as an airport, the building became an administration building.

The building housed a museum until 1997. In 2011, San Francisco purchased Treasure Island from the U.S. Navy and there are plans to reopen the museum as part of a redevelopment project.

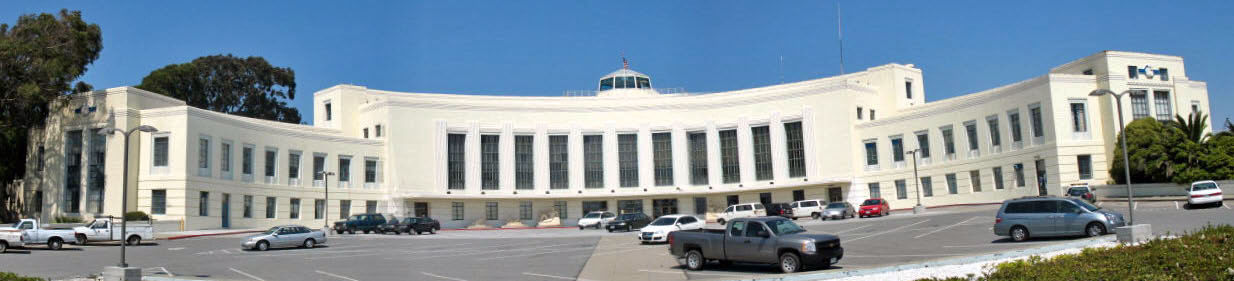

== In popular culture ==
The Administration Building served as the "Berlin Airport" in the 1989 film Indiana Jones and the Last Crusade. It appeared as a hotel in the 1998 remake of The Parent Trap and also appears in the second season of Netflix's The OA.
