= Naval Station Treasure Island =

U.S. Navy facility in San Francisco Bay (1942–1997)

- San Francisco
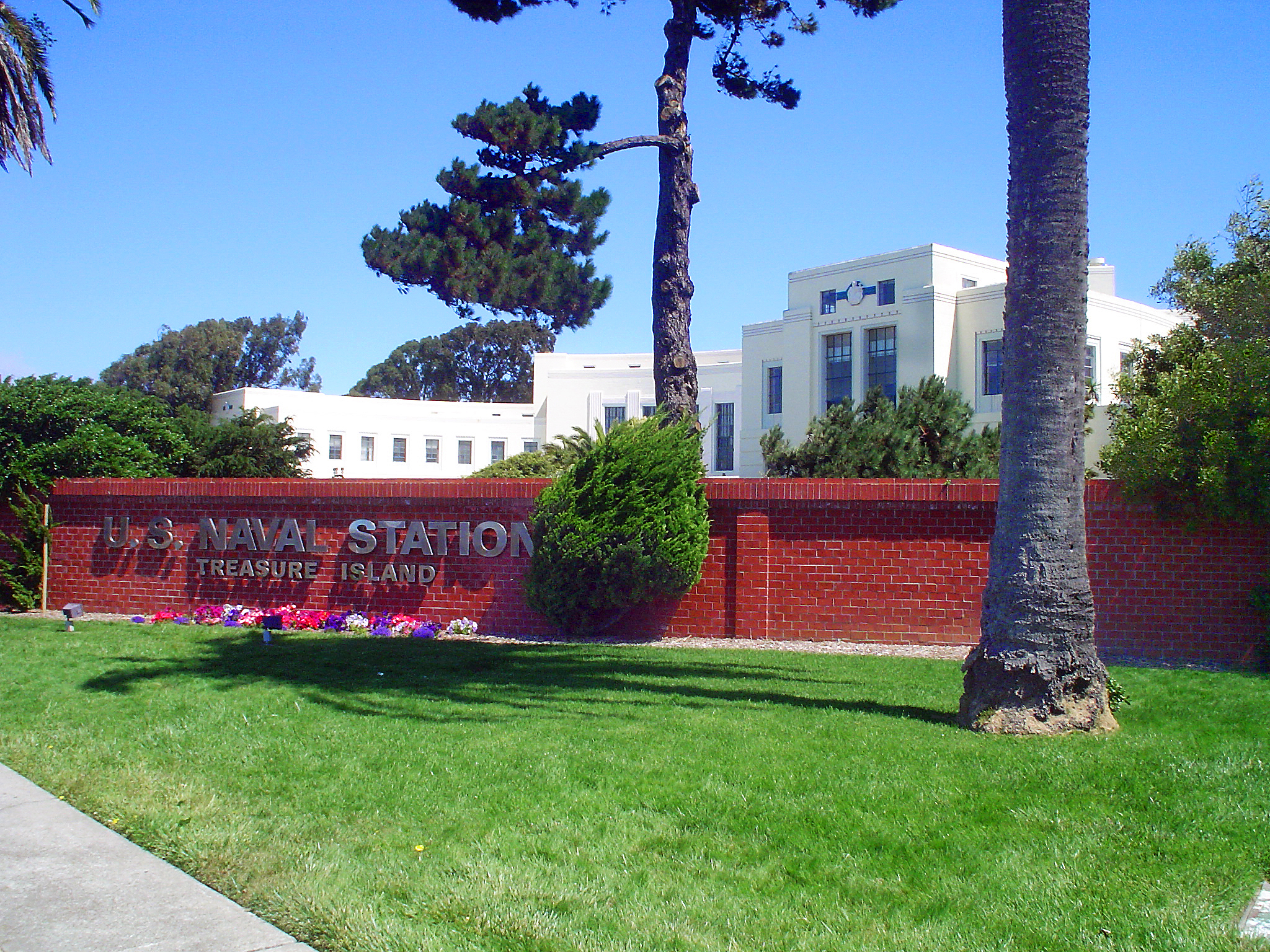
- Headquarters Building at US Naval Station Treasure Island

Site information
- Type: Navy Station
- Controlled by: United States Navy

Location
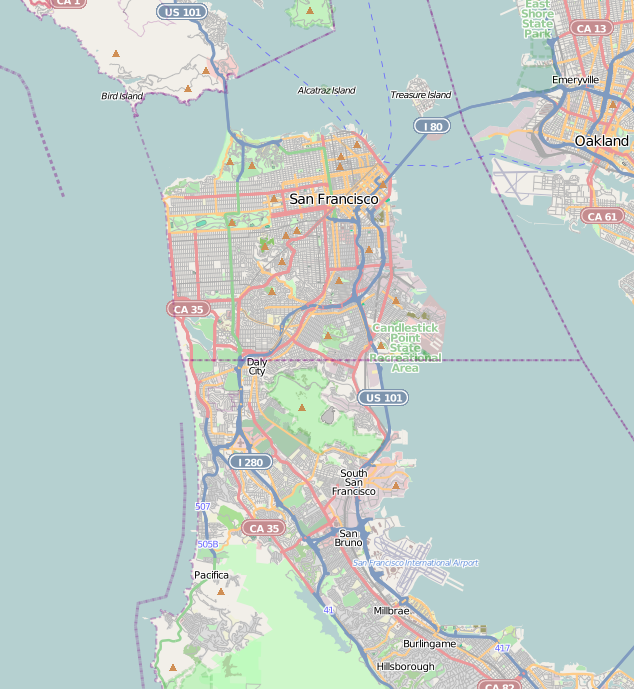
- Location within San Francisco Location within California
- Coordinates: 37.824°N 122.371°W

Site history
- Built: 1942
- In use: 1942–1997

Naval Station Treasure Island is a former United States Navy facility that operated on Treasure Island in San Francisco Bay from 1942 to 1997.

== History ==
During World War II, Treasure Island became part of the Treasure Island Naval Base, and served as an electronics and radio communications training school, and as the major Navy departure and receiving point for sailors in the Pacific aboard surface ships and submarines. The Naval Station also served as an Auxiliary Air Facility airfield, Treasure Island Naval Auxiliary Air Facility (NAAF) for airships, blimps, dirigibles, planes, and seaplanes by Hangars / Bldgs. 2 & 3. The seaplanes landed in the Port of Trade Winds Harbor. For his dedicated service in developing the Treasure Island Naval Station and Auxiliary Air Facility from inception the US Navy honored Rear Admiral Hugo Wilson Osterhaus (1878–1972) by naming the square in front of the Administration Building (at Bldg 1 on 1 Avenue of the Palms) after him.

On 9 December 1945, the three theatre complexes on the base were dedicated to World War II Naval heroes killed in action. Theatre One was named for Doris Miller, the first African American to be awarded the Navy Cross; Theatre Two was named for Medal of Honor recipient Edward O'Hare; and Theatre Three (at Bldg 401 on Avenue I and 9th Street) was named for Medal of Honor recipient Gunnery Sergeant John Basilone USMC. Broadcast nationwide on the ABC radio series Orson Welles Commentaries, the ceremonies featured Commodore Robert W. Cary, commander of the center, and Orson Welles, who interviewed family members. The three honorees were selected through a renaming contest in the base publication, The Masthead.

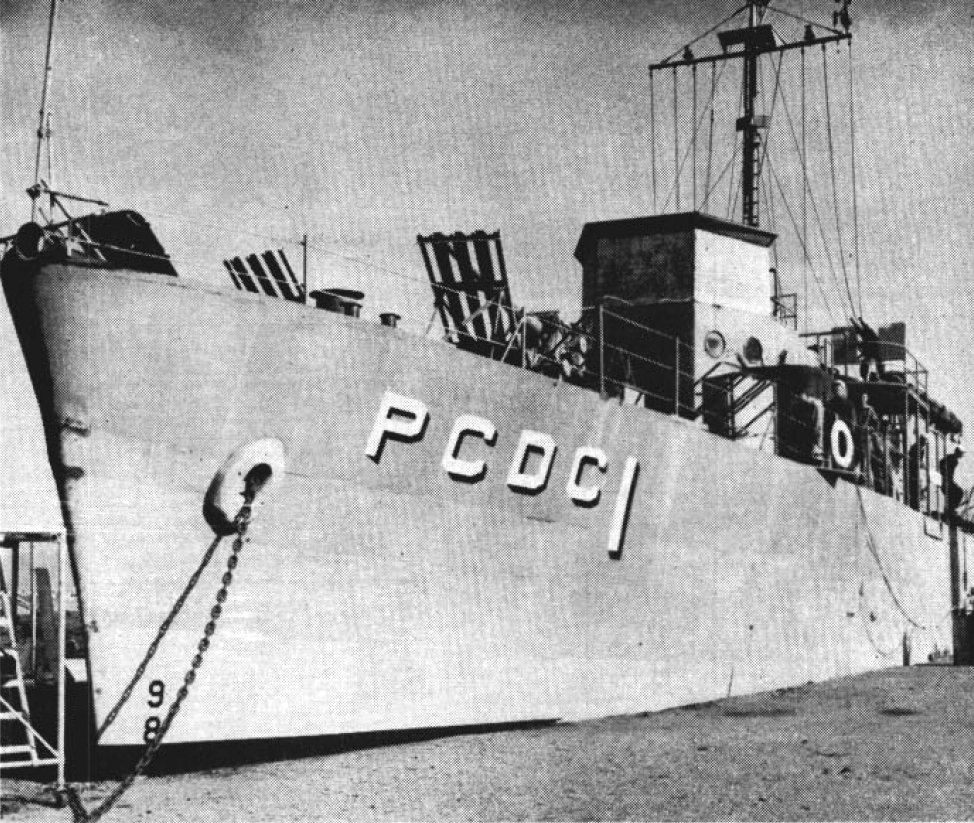
USS Pandemonium (PCDC-1) in 1957.

After the war, a training center for nuclear decontamination was established on the island. A full size mockup of a navy ship dubbed the USS Pandemonium (PCDC-1) was constructed in July 1956. Radioactive materials were placed on the land-locked ship in order to train crews in radioactive detection and cleanup. The Pandemonium remained in use until July 1969. It was moved from its original site and then demolished in 1996.

During the 1960s–1980s Treasure Island was used by the U.S. Navy for shipboard fire fighting and damage control training for Hull Maintenance Technicians and other sailors. Treasure Island housed the "USS Buttercup" (in Bldg. 341 on Avenue M and 4th Street) which was a static damage control trainer that was used for real time shipboard battle damage repair and control. The Auxiliary Air Facility airfield was limited to helicopter landing pad use at Naval Airship Square on the East side of Hangar/Bldg. 3 near the Naval firehouse at Bldg. 111. During this period Treasure Island also served as a boot camp for naval reservists.

Additionally, the Hull Maintenance Technician Training School Phase "A" was trained at Treasure Island for Nuclear, Biological, Radiological and Chemical Warfare Training as part of their phase "A" and phase "B" training.

Treasure Island was also the location for the (nominal) Electronics Technician (ET) "A" and "B" through 1974.

In 1996, Treasure Island and the Presidio of San Francisco Army Post were decommissioned and opened to public control, under stipulations. Treasure Island is now part of District 6 of the City and County of San Francisco, though it is still owned by the Navy. In 1993, the naval station was selected for closure, and Navy operations ended there in 1997. Some of the property was transferred to the Federal Highway Administration, the Labor Department and the U.S. Coast Guard, and the rest is open for development.

Problems have arisen over the determination of Treasure Island's fair-market value. The city's redevelopment agency, The Treasure Island Development Authority, valued the land at $13.8 million, and the city offered the Navy $40 million for the property. Two other estimates determined the fair market value at $250 million. However, in 2008 Congress offered the publicly held property to the city of San Francisco for nothing, under Section 2711 of HR 2647, drafted by Rep. Sam Farr.

== Names ==
Although it was designated Naval Station (NAVSTA) Treasure Island for most of its existence, the base had other names during its history:

- 1941–1947: Naval Training and Distribution Center (TADCEN) Treasure Island
- 1947–1975: Naval Station (NAVSTA) Treasure Island
- 1975–1980: Naval Support Activity (NSA) Treasure Island
- 1980–1997: Naval Station (NAVSTA) Treasure Island

== Environmental issues ==
After the Naval Station closed in 1997, Treasure Island was opened to residential and other uses, but according to the United States Environmental Protection Agency and the state Department of Toxic Substances Control, the ground at various locations on the island is contaminated with toxic substances. Caesium-137 levels three times higher than previously recorded were found in April 2013. These are thought to date from the base's use by ships contaminated in post-war nuclear testing, and from a nuclear training facility previously based there.
