= South Shore =

South Shore or Southshore may refer to:

== Places ==
=== Canada ===
- South Shore (Montreal), Quebec, the region of the greater Montreal area on the south shore of the Saint Lawrence River
- South Shore (Nova Scotia), geographic region of Nova Scotia
- South Shore—St. Margarets, the riding that covers that part of Nova Scotia

=== United States ===
- South Shore, Alameda, California
- South Shore, Lake Tahoe, California, towns on the southern perimeter of Lake Tahoe on the border between California and Nevada
- South Shore, Chicago, Illinois, a neighborhood
- Chicago South Shore and South Bend Railroad, freight rail line from Chicago, Illinois to South Bend, Indiana
- South Shore, Kentucky, a city
- South Shore (Long Island), southern edge of Long Island in New York state
- South Shore (Massachusetts), a region south of Boston
- South Shore (Pittsburgh), Pennsylvania, a neighborhood
- South Shore, South Dakota, a town
- South Shore, Staten Island, New York, a series of neighborhoods in New York City
- South Shore School District, Port Wing, Wisconsin

=== Elsewhere ===
- South Shore, Blackpool, England
- Southshore, New Zealand

== Arts and Entertainment ==
- "Southshore" ("The Awakeners, Volume 2") is a 1987 speculative fiction book by Sheri S. Tepper

== See also ==
- South Shore High School (disambiguation)
- South Shore Line (disambiguation)
- South Shore station (disambiguation)
- South Shore Mall (disambiguation)
