= Fernside =

Fernside may refer to:

- Fernside, Alameda, California, a neighbourhood in Alameda County, California, United States
- Fernside, New Zealand, rural community in Canterbury in New Zealand's South Island
- Fernside railway station disused railway station north-east of Featherston in New Zealand's North Island
- Fernside Homestead a historic home in Featherston, New Zealand
- Fernside, Toowoomba, a heritage-listed house in Queensland, Australia
- Fernside-Vacation House for Working Girls, Princeton, Massachusetts, United States
- Fernside, a Dublin IRA safe house of the 1920s; see Home Farm Road
