= SSHS (disambiguation) =

SSHS is an abbreviation for the Saffir–Simpson hurricane scale.

It can also be used as an abbreviation for several high schools:

- Saipan Southern High School
- Saratoga Springs High School
- Seoul Science High School
- South Shore High School (disambiguation)
- Speedway Senior High School
- Sugarloaf Senior High School
- Sheboygan South High School
- South Sydney High School
- South Salem High School
- Southport State High School
