= Masonic Temple and Lodge (Alameda, California) =

Historic building in Alameda, California, United States

- U.S. National Register of Historic Places
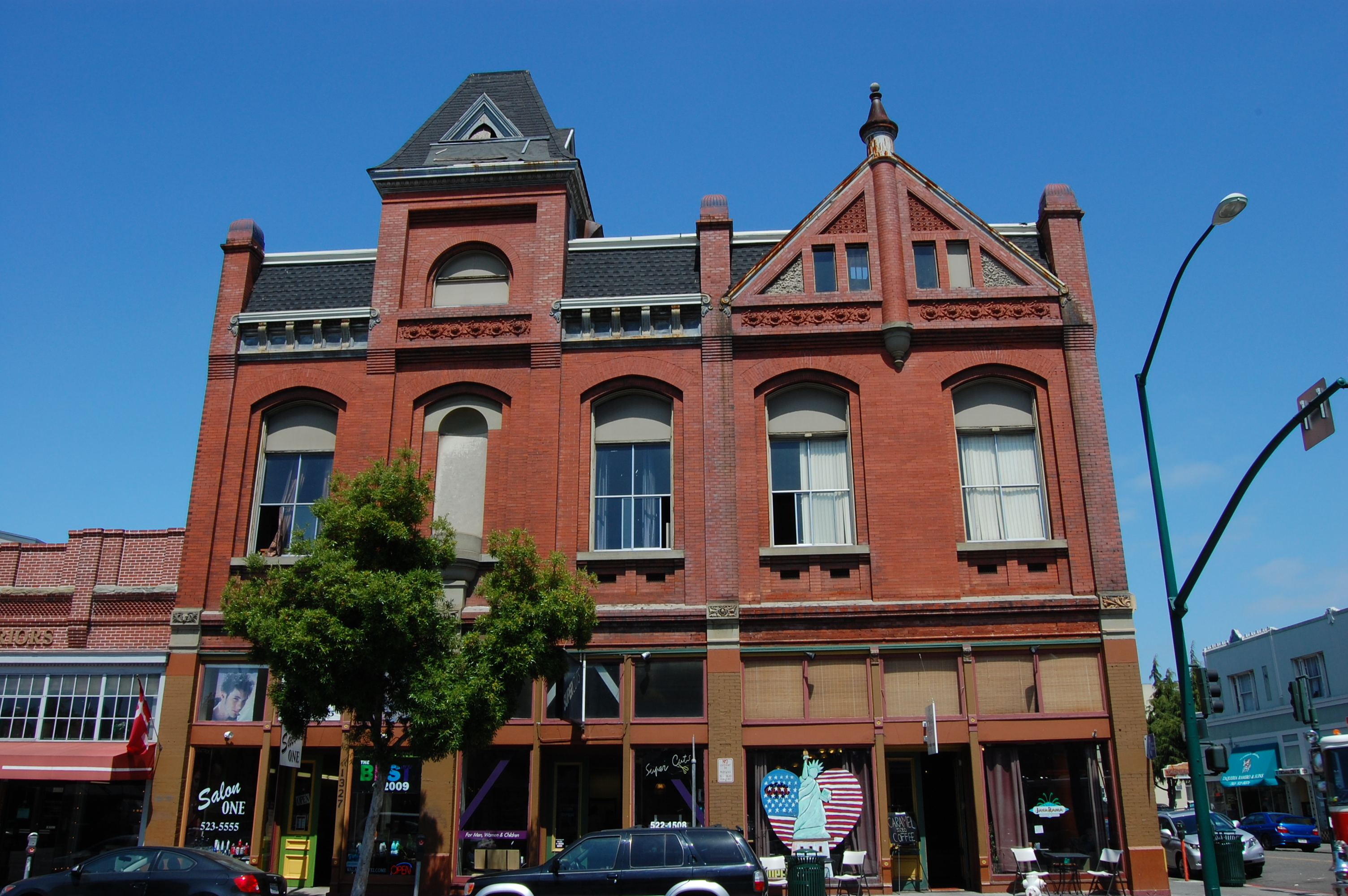
- The 1891 Masonic Temple, Photographed from the east side of Park St.

- Location within Oakland, California Location within California Location within the United States
- Location: 1329--31 Park St. and 2312 Alameda Ave., Alameda, California
- Coordinates: 37°45′48″N 122°14′34″W
- Area: 0.4 acres (0.16 ha)
- Built: 1890–91, 1927
- Architects: Mau, Charles; Symmes, Edwin
- Architectural style: Spanish Revival, Victorian Eclectic
- NRHP reference No.: 82002153
- Added to NRHP: March 25, 1982

The Masonic Temple and Lodge are two adjacent Masonic buildings in downtown Alameda, California, United States, that are listed on the National Register of Historic Places (NRHP).

== Description ==
The older Masonic Temple at 1329–31 Park St was built from 1890 to 1891. The building was designed in the Victorian Eclectic style and features brick piers which extend above the roof line, a tower on the south side of the roof, and an arched stone entrance with carved doors.

The newer Masonic Lodge adjacent to the original temple at 2312 Alameda Ave is a Spanish Renaissance building constructed in 1927, and was added to provide both an auto parking lot on the ground floor, and an elevator to all four floors of the building that had only previously been accessible by stairs. The building features decorative carvings which adorn its entrances, archways, cornices, and window surrounds, and features two lodge rooms side by side, allowing both Masons and Eastern Stars to meet at the same time, as well as a full kitchen and dining room on the top floor. The Large Lodge Room features a built-in wheel of stained glass emblems in the symbolic East, allowing the room to be quickly changed from a Blue Lodge to the emblem of other frequent renters with a turn of the wheel, as well an organ loft with trap door to a Room of Contemplation, and a passage with multiple hidden doors to the lodge rooms for use in Appendant Body ceremonies. Two of the original stained glass windows from the front of the Park Street face of the Masonic Temple were removed before its sale and are now displayed in the Small Lodge Room of the currently active Masonic Lodge.

Oak Grove Lodge #215 (originally located in the Temple and then later moving to the Lodge) helped build the city's first school and the First Methodist Episcopal Church. Prominent members of lodges which met in the building have included U.S. congressmen Joseph R. Knowland and William Knowland, poet Joaquin Miller, and eight of Alameda's mayors.

Because the name "Alameda Masonic Lodge" was already taken by #163 in Fremont, CA (the Fremont Lodge is adjacent to Alameda Creek), "Island City Masonic Lodge" is the modern name of Masonic Lodge #215 today in the city of Alameda (which continues to use the number #215 in honor of Oak Grove Lodge). The modern street entrance to the Lodge is not on Park Street, but at 2312 Alameda Ave, Alameda, CA. Originally the first floor of the building was the member's car parking lot, but the car entrances have since been glassed in and become home to the Alameda Museum. Informal meetings are Thursday nights 6pm, with the fancier "Trestleboard" dinner the first Thursday of each month. Alameda Oak Leaf #8, the co-ed Order of the Eastern Star, also meets at the Alameda Masonic Temple, as does the Oakland Council No. 12 Cryptic Masons of the Oakland York Rite, an advanced masonic order open only to regular Master Masons of the Grand Lodge of California, and Pharos Lodge, an irregular co-ed masonic lodge not under the authority of the Grand Lodge of California and not in communication with first three regular masonic bodies in the same building.

The buildings were listed on the NRHP March 25, 1982.

== See also ==
- National Register of Historic Places listings in Alameda County, California
