= South Shore Mall =

South Shore Mall can refer to the following things:

- South Shore Plaza in Braintree, Massachusetts
- South Shore Mall in Bay Shore, New York (which was originally named the “Westfield South Shore Mall”)
- Shoppes at Riverside, formerly the South Shore Mall, in Aberdeen, Washington

== See also ==
- South Shore (disambiguation)
