= Woodstock, Alameda, California =

Coordinates: 37°46′35″N 122°17′09″W

Woodstock is a neighborhood in Alameda in Alameda County, California. It lies at an elevation of 13 feet (4 m).

It was one of the original three settlements formed in 1853 on Alameda island. In 1872, the towns of Alameda, Encinal and Woodstock (on the west end), were joined together and incorporated as the Town of Alameda with a population of 2,000 persons.
