= Alameda, California =

City in California, United States

- City
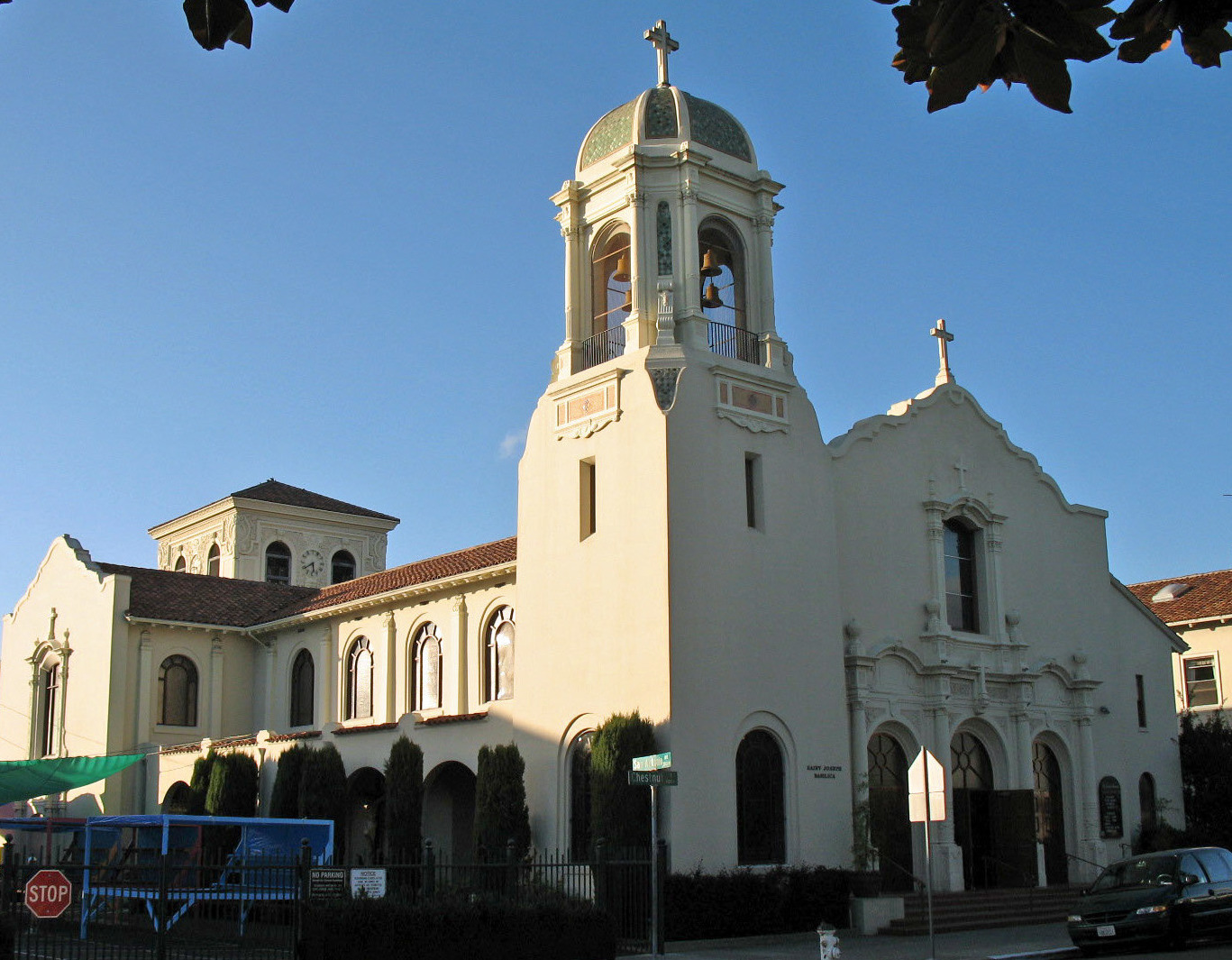
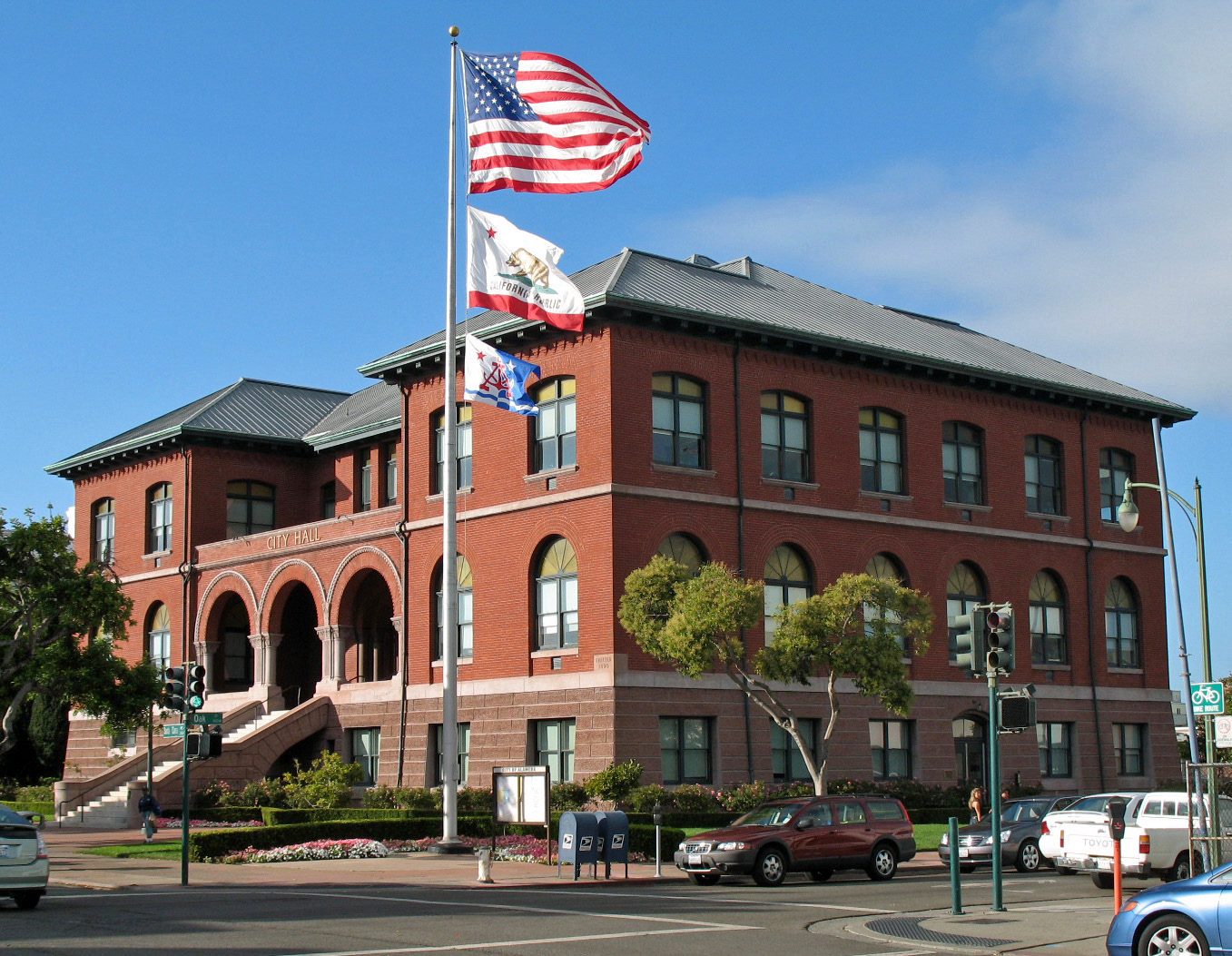
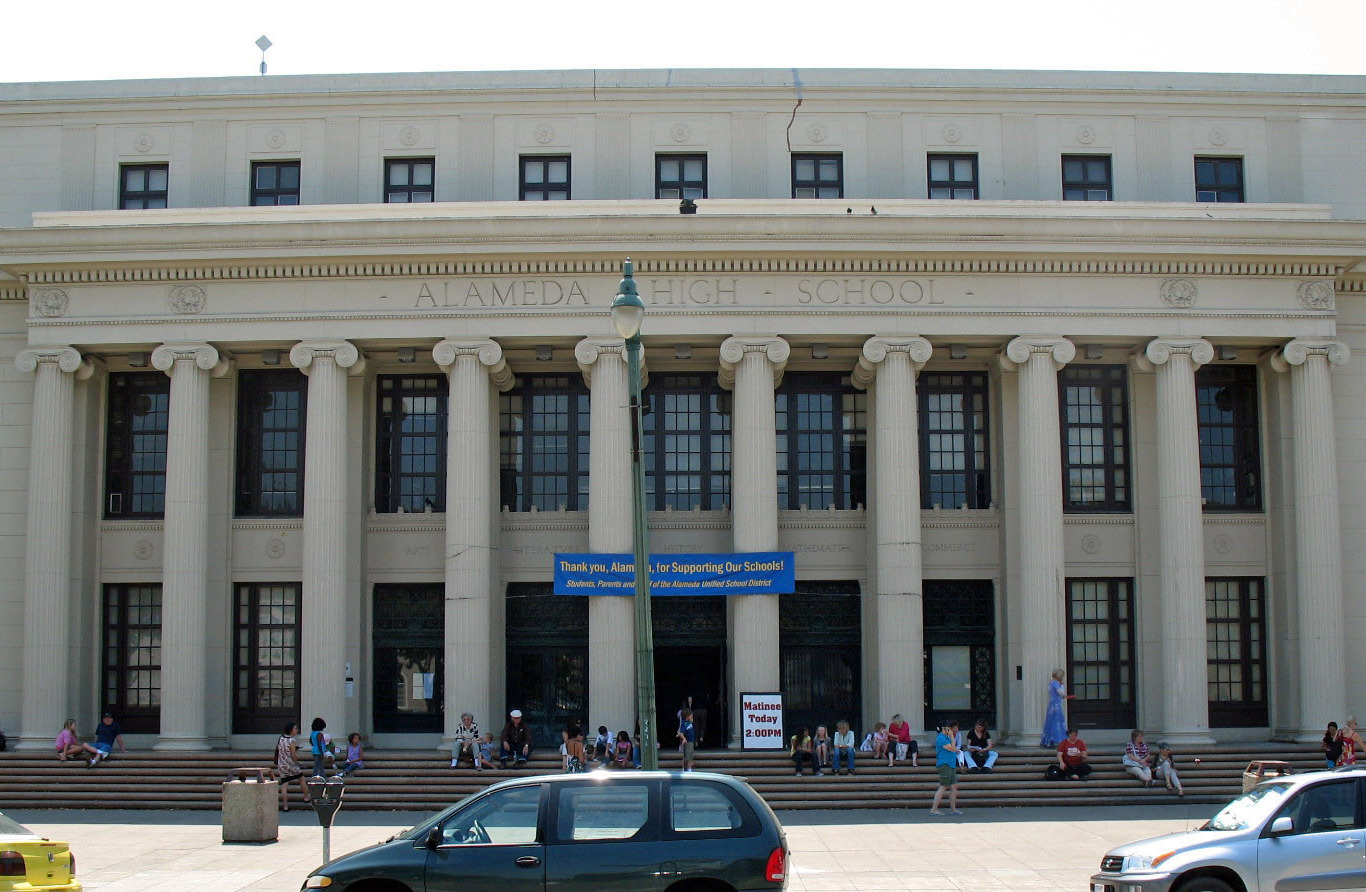
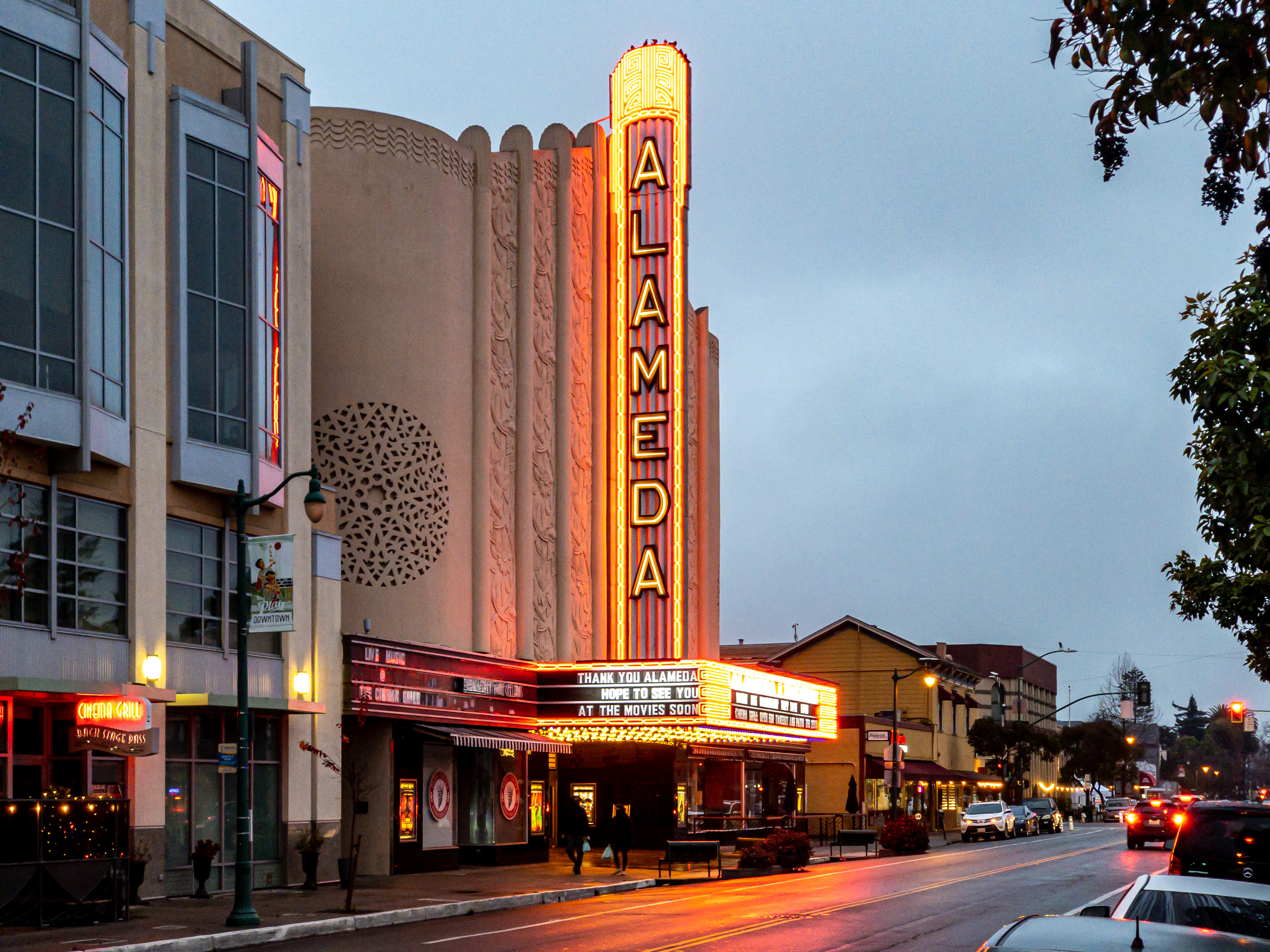
- Basilica of St. Joseph Alameda City Hall Alameda High School Alameda Theatre

- Flag Seal
- Nickname: The Island City
- Motto: Prosperita terra mari que ("Prosperity from the land and the sea")
- Interactive map of Alameda, California
- Coordinates: 37°45′22″N 122°16′28″W
- Country: United States
- State: California
- County: Alameda
- Founded Incorporated: June 6, 1853; April 19, 1854

Government
  - Type: Council–manager
  - Mayor: Marilyn Ezzy Ashcraft
  - State senator: Jesse Arreguín (D)
  - Assemblymember: Mia Bonta (D)
  - U.S. rep.: Lateefah Simon (D)

Area
  - Total: 22.98 sq mi (59.52 km^{2})
  - Land: 10.45 sq mi (27.06 km^{2})
  - Water: 12.53 sq mi (32.45 km^{2}) 53.79%
- Elevation: 33 ft (10 m)

Population (2020)
  - Total: 78,280
  - Density: 7,491.9/sq mi (2,892.62/km^{2})
- Demonym: Alamedan
- Time zone: UTC−8 (Pacific)
  - Summer (DST): UTC−7 (PDT)
- ZIP Codes: 94501–94502
- Area codes: 510, 341
- FIPS code: 06-00562
- GNIS feature IDs: 277468, 2409669
- Website: alamedaca.gov

Alameda (/ˌæləˈmiːdə/ AL-ə-MEE-də; Spanish: [alaˈmeða]; Spanish for "tree-lined path") is a city in Alameda County, California, United States, located in the East Bay region of the Bay Area. The city is built on an informal archipelago in San Francisco Bay, consisting of Alameda Island, Bay Farm Island and Coast Guard Island, along with other smaller islands. As of the 2020 census, the city's population was 78,280.

== History ==
=== Ohlone era ===
Alameda originally occupied a peninsula connected to Oakland. The area was low-lying and marshy, while higher ground was part of one of the largest coastal oak forests in the world. A local band of the Ohlone tribe inhabited the region for more than 3,000 years. They were present at the time of the arrival of the Spanish in the late 18th century. The Ohlone created numerous oyster shell mounds across the peninsula, some as large as 14 feet tall.

=== Spanish and Mexican eras ===
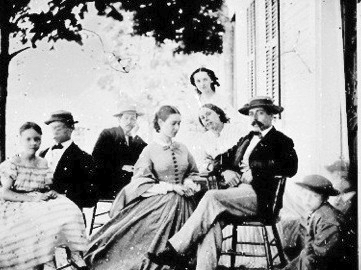
Alameda and much of the East Bay was part of Rancho San Antonio, granted to the Peralta family in 1820.

Spanish colonists called the area Encinal, meaning "forest of evergreen oak". What is now Alameda, and much of the East Bay was included in the vast Rancho San Antonio granted to Don Luis María Peralta by the Spanish king who claimed California. The grant was later confirmed by the Republic of Mexico after its independence in 1821 from Spain. Over time, the place became known as Bolsa de Encinal or Encinal de San Antonio.

=== Early California era ===
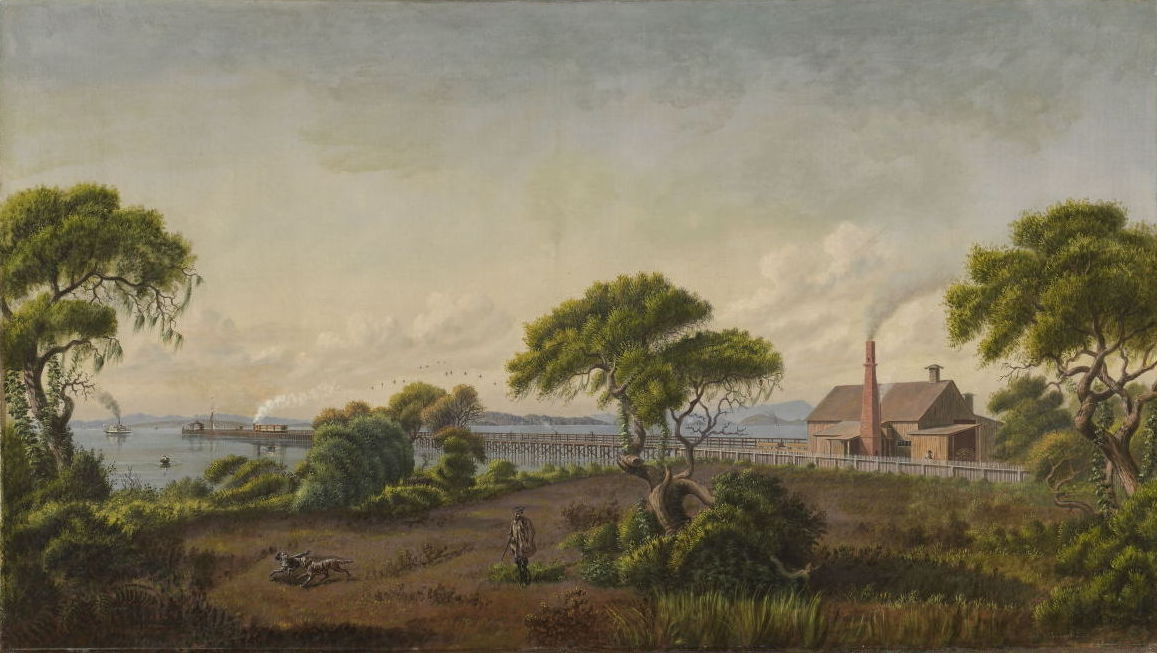
The Alameda Shore, painted by Joseph Lee c. 1868

The city of Alameda was founded on June 6, 1853, following the Mexican–American War of 1848 and the subsequent acquisition of California by the U.S.

The name Alameda is Spanish for "grove of poplar trees" or "tree-lined avenue" and was chosen in 1853 as city's official name by popular vote.

At the time, Alameda comprised three small settlements:

- Alameda — a village at Encinal and High streets
- Hibbardsville — located at the North Shore ferry and shipping terminal, and
- Woodstock — on the west near the ferry piers of the South Pacific Coast and the Central Pacific Railroads. Eventually, the Central Pacific's ferry pier became the Alameda Mole.

The borders of Alameda were expanded to include the entire island in 1872, incorporating Woodstock into Alameda.

In his autobiography, writer Mark Twain described Alameda as "The Garden of California."

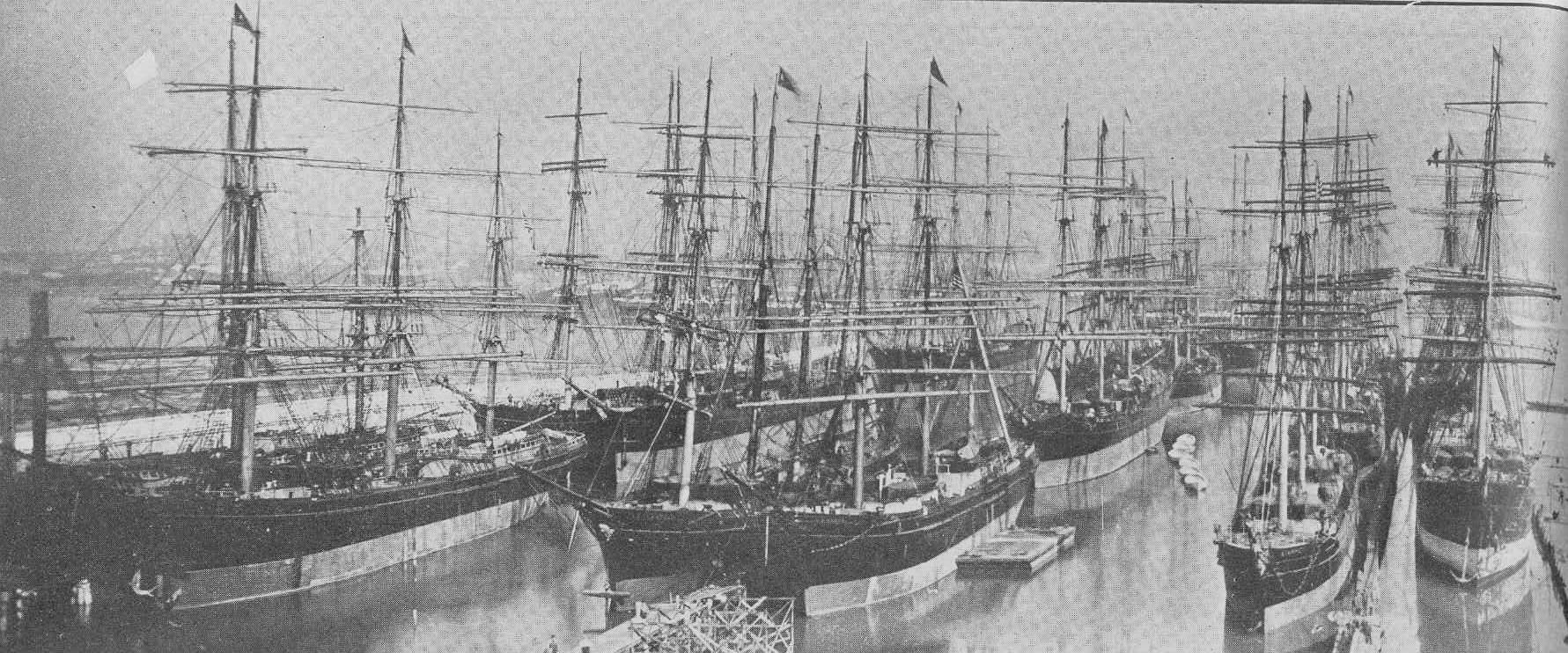
Alameda shipyards at the turn of the 20th century

The first post office opened in 1854. The first school, Schermerhorn School, was opened a year later in 1855 (eventually renamed as Lincoln School). The San Francisco and Alameda Railroad opened the Encinal station in 1864. The early formation of the Park Street Historic Commercial District (or downtown) was centered near the train lines. Encinal's own post office opened in 1876, was renamed West End in 1877, and closed in 1891.

On September 6, 1869, the Alameda Terminal made history; it was the site of the arrival of the first train via the First transcontinental railroad to reach the shores of San Francisco Bay, marking the first coast to coast transcontinental railroad in North America.

The Croll Building, on the corner of Webster Street and Central Avenue, was the site of Croll's Gardens and Hotel, used as training quarters for some of the most popular fighters in boxing from 1883 to 1914. Jack Johnson and several other champions all stayed and trained here.

The need for expanded shipping facilities and increased flow of current through the estuary led to the dredging of a tidal canal through the marshland between Oakland and Alameda. Construction started in 1874, but it was not completed until 1902, resulting in Alameda becoming an island.

=== Modern era ===
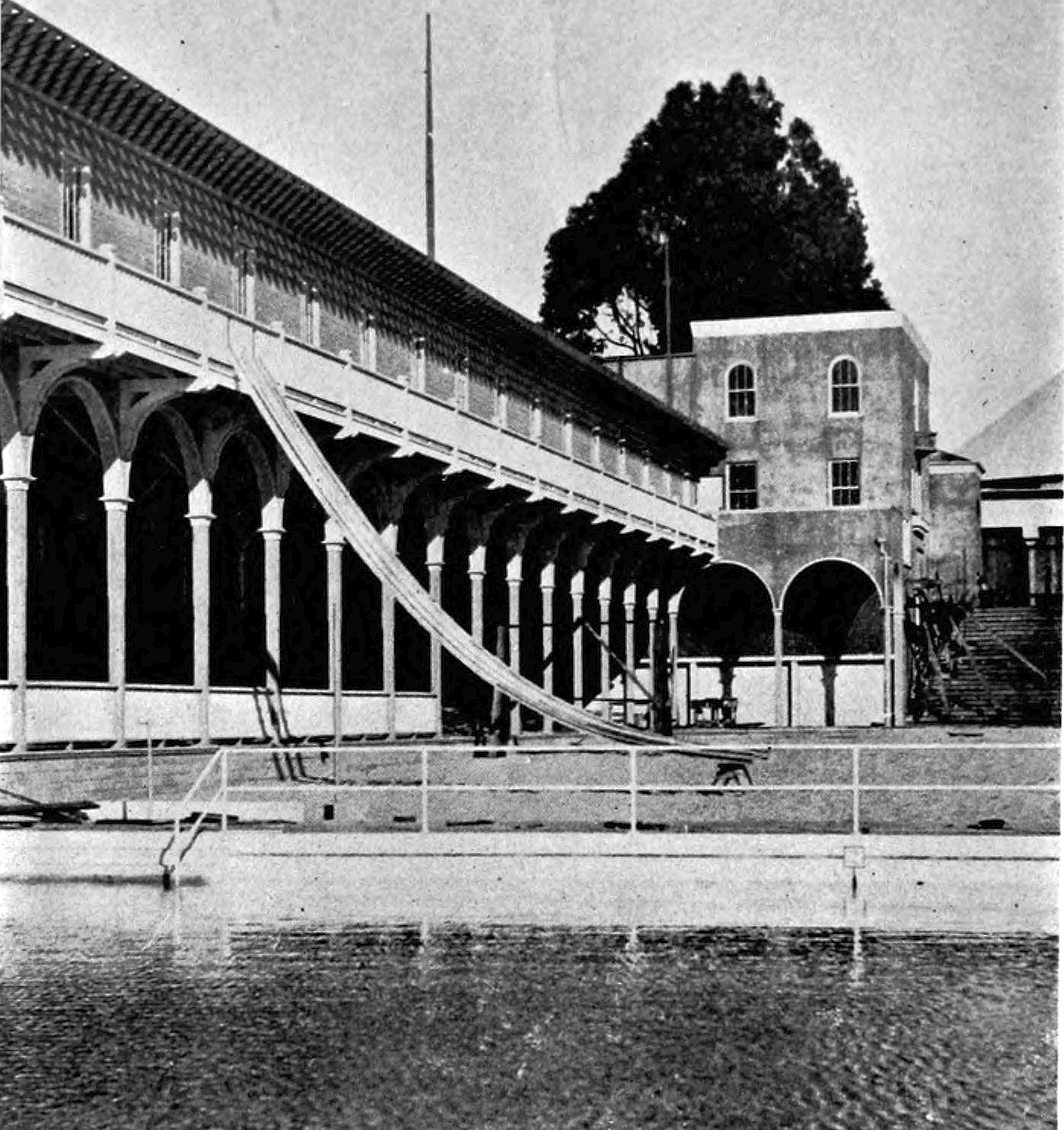
Neptune Beach, established in 1917

In 1917, a private entertainment park called Neptune Beach was built in the area now known as Crab Cove, which became a major recreation destination in the 1920s and 1930s. It was sometimes referred to as the "Coney Island of the West". The popsicle was first sold to the public at Neptune Beach in 1923. The park closed down in 1939.

The Alameda Works Shipyard was one of the largest and best-equipped shipyards in the country. Together with other industrial facilities, it became part of the defense industry buildup before and during World War II, which attracted many migrants from other parts of the United States for the high-paying jobs. In the 1950s, Alameda's industrial and shipbuilding industries thrived along the Alameda Estuary.

In the early 21st century, the Port of Oakland, across the estuary, has become one of the largest ports on the West Coast. Its operators use shipping technologies originally experimented within Alameda. As of April 2006, Alameda is a "Coast Guard City", one of six then designated in the country (as of 2025, it is one of 34).

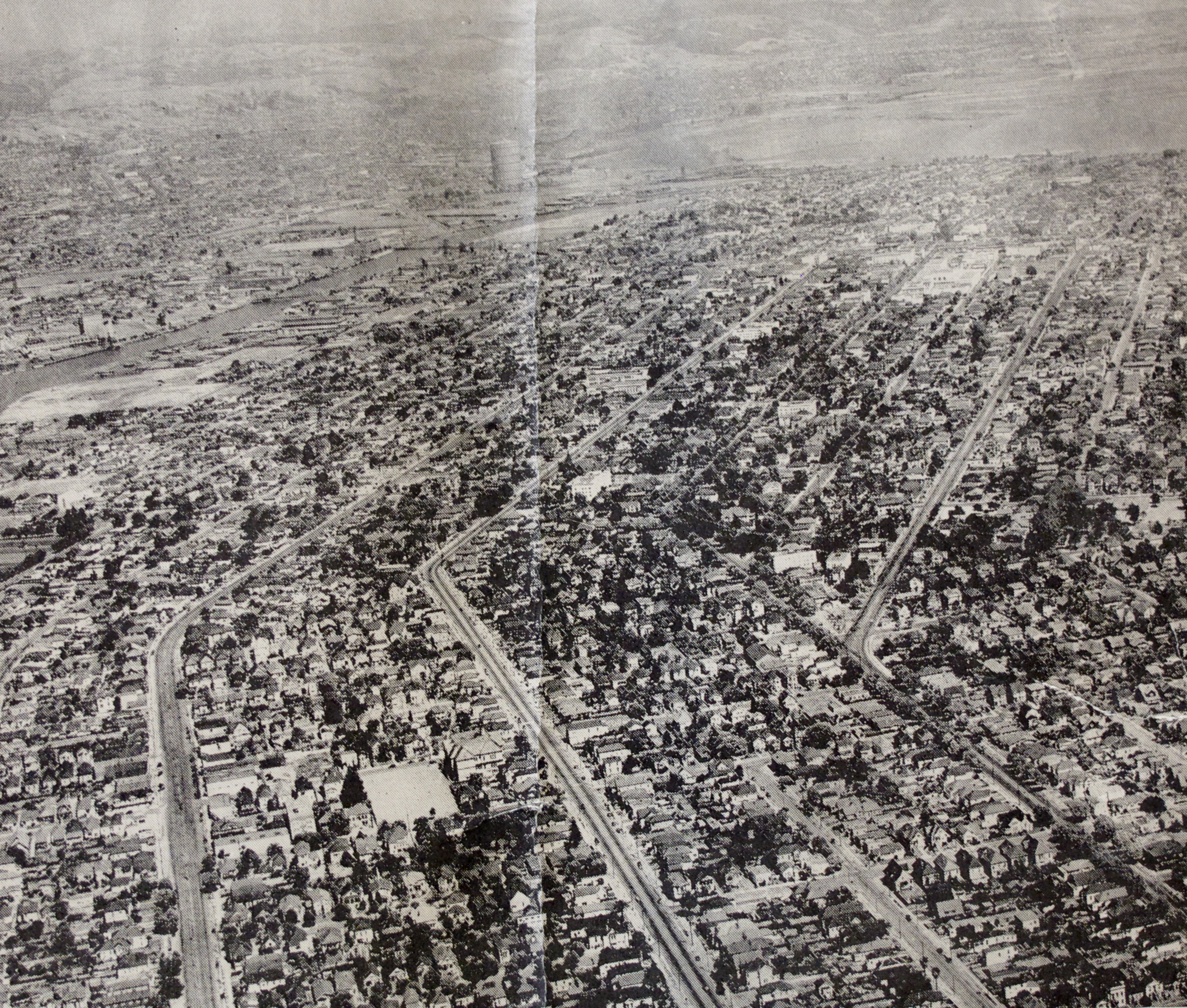
Aerial view of Alameda, 1936

In addition to the regular trains running to the Alameda Mole, Alameda was also served by local steam commuter lines of the Southern Pacific (initially, the Central Pacific). Alameda was the site of the Southern Pacific's West Alameda Shops, where all the electric trains were maintained and repaired. These were later adapted as the East Bay Electric Lines. The trains ran to both the Oakland Mole and the Alameda Mole.

In the 1930s Pan American Airways established a seaplane port along with the fill that led to the Alameda Mole, the original home base for the China Clipper flying boat. In 1929, the University of California established the San Francisco Airdrome located near the current Webster Street tube as a public airport. The Bay Airdrome had its gala christening party in 1930. The Airdrome was closed in 1941 when its air traffic interfered with the newly built Naval Air Station Alameda (NAS Alameda).

In the late 1950s, the Utah Construction Company began a landfill beyond the Old Sea Wall and created South Shore.

On February 7, 1973, a USN Vought A-7E Corsair II fighter jet on a routine training mission from Lemoore Naval Air Station suddenly caught fire 28,000 feet (8,500 m) above the San Francisco Bay, crashing into the Tahoe Apartments in Alameda. Eleven people including the pilot died in the crash and fire.

== Geography ==
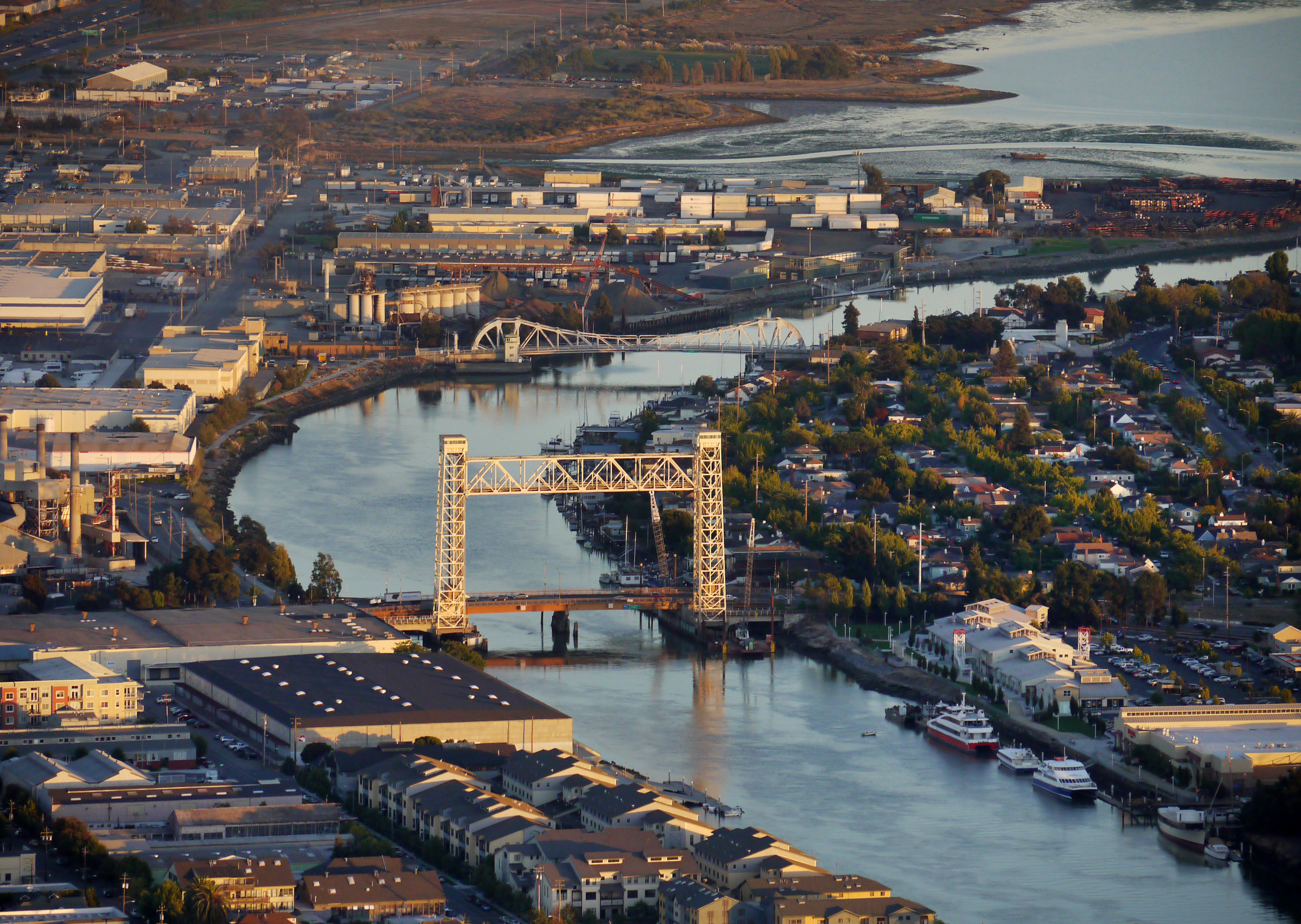
Fruitvale Bridge, spanning the Oakland Estuary, connects Alameda in the south to Oakland in the north.

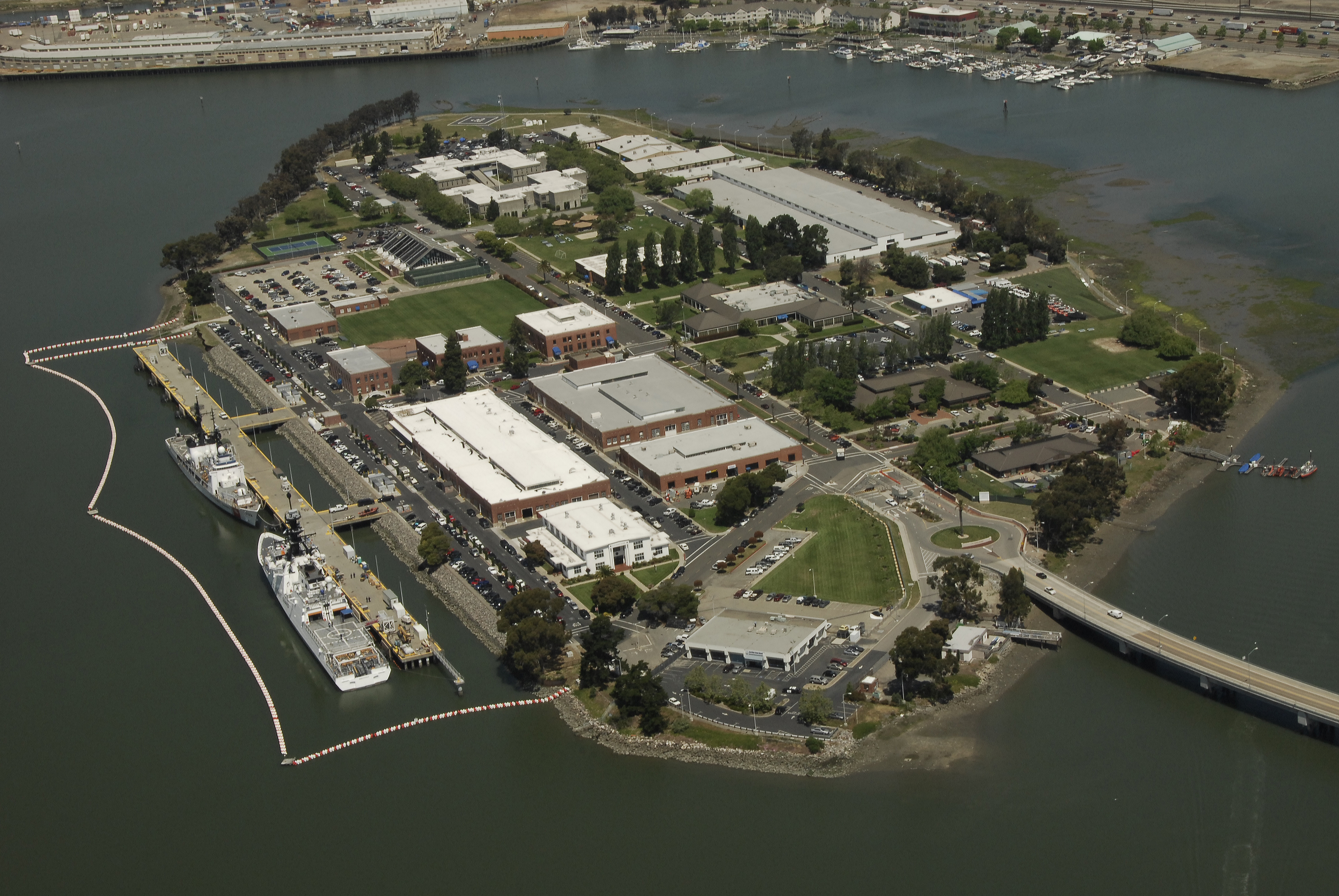
Coast Guard Island

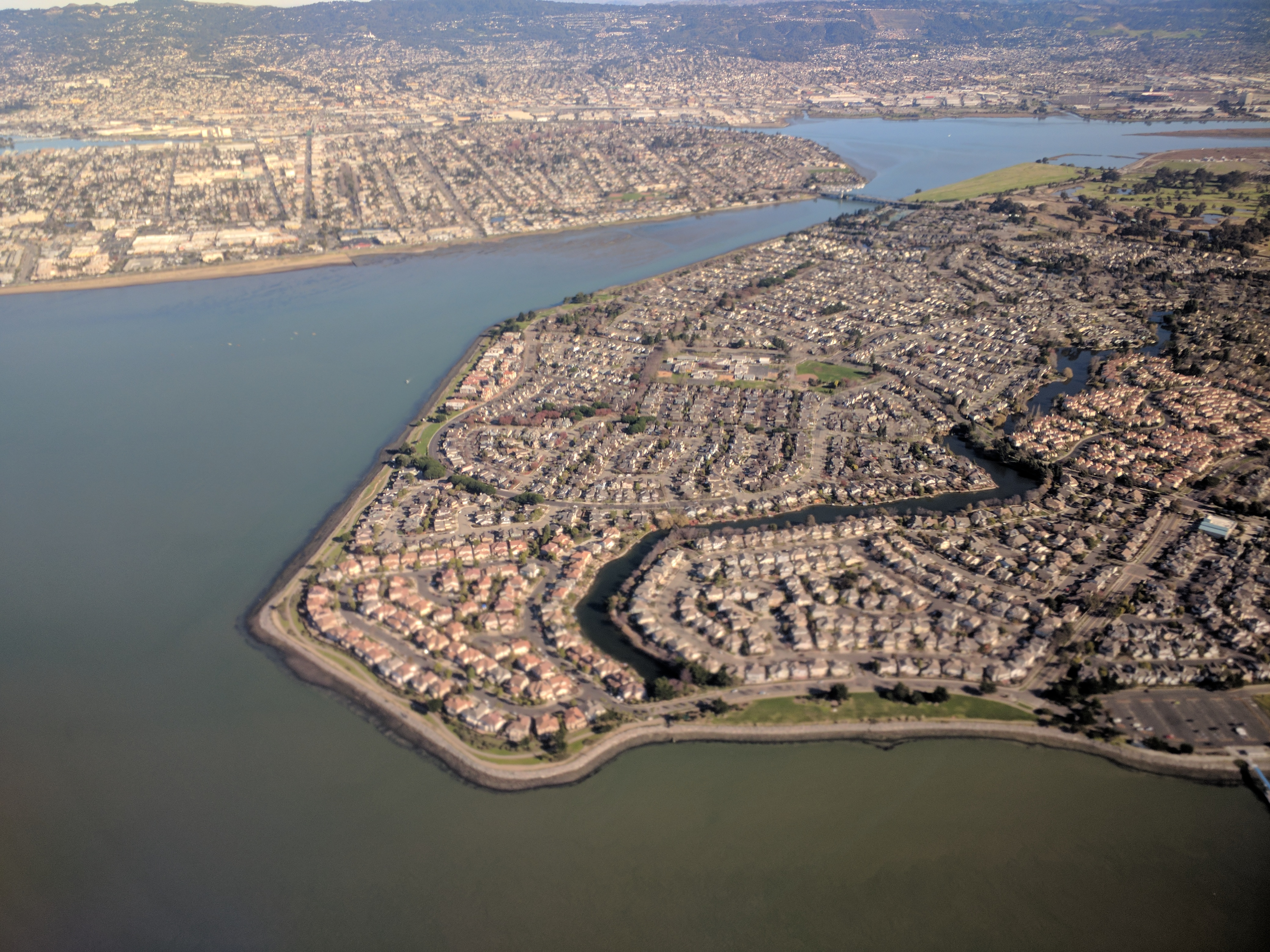
View of Bay Farm Island

Alameda has been given the nickname "The Island City". It consists of three major areas:

- Alameda Island – The main island of Alameda, it was created by dredging a channel between Oakland and the former peninsula.
- Bay Farm Island – Part of the mainland proper, and attached to Oakland.
- Coast Guard Island – A small island between Alameda Island and Oakland, home of Integrated Support Command Alameda.

Alameda Point, Bay Farm Island, and South Shore are largely built on bay fill. Not all of Alameda Island is part of the City of Alameda; a small portion of a dump site west of the former runway at Alameda Naval Air Station extends far enough into San Francisco Bay that it is over the county line and therefore part of the City and County of San Francisco. Ballena Isle, an even smaller island, is also part of Alameda.

=== Neighborhoods ===
Alameda comprises numerous neighborhoods spread across the main island and Bay Farm. While the city has no official lists, names have been given to multiple:

- Alameda Point – Located near the western end of the island, Alameda point comprises the former Naval Air Station Alameda area. It houses numerous breweries, housing developments, and offices.
- Bronze Coast
- Central Alameda
- East End
- Fernside
- Gold Coast
- Harbor Bay
- Marina Village
- South Shore – Also known as Shoreline, it is separated from the main part of Alameda Island by a lagoon. It houses the South Shore Center shopping plaza, which contains grocery stores and restaurants.
- West End

=== Climate ===
This region experiences warm (but not hot), dry summers, and cool (but not cold), wet winters. According to the Köppen climate classification system, Alameda has a warm-summer Mediterranean climate, abbreviated "Csb" on climate maps. Annual precipitation is about 22 in (560 mm), all rain (snow is extremely rare at sea level in the San Francisco Bay Area).

Climate data for Alameda NAS, California
Month	Jan	Feb	Mar	Apr	May	Jun	Jul	Aug	Sep	Oct	Nov	Dec	Year
Mean daily maximum °F (°C)	58.3 (14.6)	61.8 (16.6)	64.6 (18.1)	67.5 (19.7)	69.4 (20.8)	71.6 (22.0)	72.0 (22.2)	73.0 (22.8)	74.3 (23.5)	72.3 (22.4)	65.4 (18.6)	58.5 (14.7)	67.4 (19.7)
Daily mean °F (°C)	52.3 (11.3)	55.3 (12.9)	57.7 (14.3)	59.7 (15.4)	61.8 (16.6)	63.9 (17.7)	64.7 (18.2)	65.7 (18.7)	66.6 (19.2)	64.5 (18.1)	58.7 (14.8)	52.9 (11.6)	60.3 (15.7)
Mean daily minimum °F (°C)	46.4 (8.0)	48.9 (9.4)	50.8 (10.4)	51.9 (11.1)	54.2 (12.3)	56.2 (13.4)	57.5 (14.2)	58.4 (14.7)	58.9 (14.9)	56.6 (13.7)	52.0 (11.1)	47.3 (8.5)	53.3 (11.8)
Average rainfall inches (mm)	4.21 (107)	4.10 (104)	2.74 (70)	1.18 (30)	0.72 (18)	0.15 (3.8)	0.01 (0.25)	0.04 (1.0)	0.19 (4.8)	1.94 (49)	2.50 (64)	4.00 (102)	21.78 (553.85)
Average rainy days (≥ 0.01 in)	10.3	9.5	11.4	5.5	3.1	1.4	0.4	0.6	1.6	3.6	8.4	10.6	66.4
Source: NCEI (Data Tools: 1981–2010 Normals)

=== Hazards ===
The low-lying island has seen sea-level and groundwater level rise threaten its infrastructure and people not just through flooding events, but through the increased liquefaction risk from more saturated soils. The locations of increasing groundwater-induced risks and flooding risks may be most precise in private insurance company maps.

== Demographics ==
Historical population
Census	Pop.	Note	%±
1860	460		—
1870	1,557		238.5%
1880	5,708		266.6%
1890	11,165		95.6%
1900	16,464		47.5%
1910	23,383		42.0%
1920	28,806		23.2%
1930	35,033		21.6%
1940	36,256		3.5%
1950	64,430		77.7%
1960	63,855		−0.9%
1970	70,968		11.1%
1980	63,852		−10.0%
1990	76,459		19.7%
2000	72,259		−5.5%
2010	73,812		2.1%
2020	78,280		6.1%
2025 (est.)	76,876	▼	−1.8%
U.S. Decennial Census; 1860–1870 1880-1890; 1900 1910 1920; 1930 1940 1950; 1960 1970 1980; 1990 2000 2010; 2020

=== Racial and ethnic composition ===
Alameda, California – Racial and ethnic composition Note: the US Census treats Hispanic/Latino as an ethnic category. This table excludes Latinos from the racial categories and assigns them to a separate category. Hispanics/Latinos may be of any race.
Race / Ethnicity (NH = Non-Hispanic)	Pop 2000	Pop 2010	Pop 2020	% 2000	% 2010	% 2020
White alone (NH)	37,921	33,468	32,152	52.48%	45.34%	41.07%
Black or African American alone (NH)	4,350	4,516	4,399	6.02%	6.12%	5.62%
Native American or Alaska Native alone (NH)	365	247	173	0.51%	0.33%	0.22%
Asian alone (NH)	18,757	22,822	25,107	25.96%	30.92%	32.07%
Pacific Islander alone (NH)	407	342	356	0.56%	0.46%	0.45%
Other race alone (NH)	235	278	556	0.33%	0.38%	0.71%
Mixed race or Multiracial (NH)	3,499	4,047	6,102	4.84%	5.48%	7.80%
Hispanic or Latino (any race)	6,725	8,092	9,435	9.31%	10.96%	12.05%
Total	72,259	73,812	78,280	100.00%	100.00%	100.00%

=== 2020 census ===
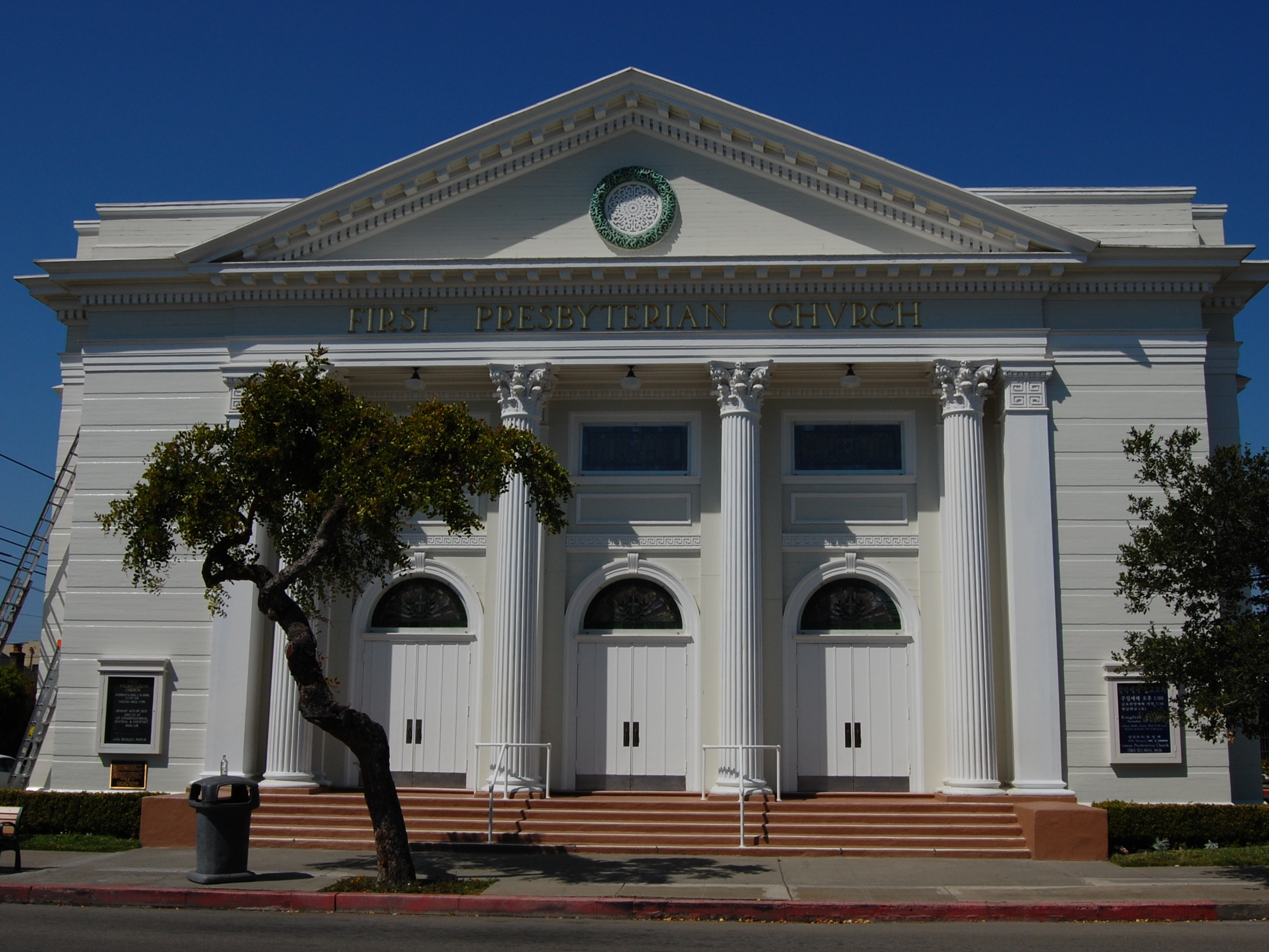
First Presbyterian Church

As of the 2020 census, Alameda had a population of 78,280 and a population density of 7,491.6 inhabitants per square mile (2,892.5/km^{2}). The census reported that 98.0% of residents lived in households, 0.8% lived in non-institutionalized group quarters, and 1.2% were institutionalized.

The age distribution was 19.9% under the age of 18, 6.7% aged 18 to 24, 28.4% aged 25 to 44, 27.4% aged 45 to 64, and 17.5% who were 65 years of age or older, and the median age was 41.4 years. For every 100 females there were 91.2 males, and for every 100 females age 18 and over there were 88.2 males age 18 and over.

There were 30,980 households in Alameda, of which 30.2% had children under the age of 18 living in them. Of all households, 47.7% were married-couple households, 6.6% were cohabiting couple households, 17.0% were households with a male householder and no spouse or partner present, and 28.7% were households with a female householder and no spouse or partner present. About 28.3% of all households were made up of individuals and 11.2% had someone living alone who was 65 years of age or older; the average household size was 2.48. There were 19,640 families (63.4% of all households).

There were 33,009 housing units at an average density of 3,159.1 units per square mile (1,219.7 units/km^{2}), of which 6.1% were vacant. The homeowner vacancy rate was 0.4% and the rental vacancy rate was 5.3%. Of the 30,980 occupied housing units, 48.3% were owner-occupied and 51.7% were occupied by renters.

Racial composition as of the 2020 census
Race	Number	Percent
White	34,102	43.6%
Black or African American	4,608	5.9%
American Indian and Alaska Native	441	0.6%
Asian	25,412	32.5%
Native Hawaiian and Other Pacific Islander	399	0.5%
Some other race	3,244	4.1%
Two or more races	10,074	12.9%
Hispanic or Latino (of any race)	9,435	12.1%

=== 2023 American Community Survey ===
In 2023, the US Census Bureau estimated that 25.4% of the population were foreign-born. Of all people aged 5 or older, 65.4% spoke only English at home, 6.7% spoke Spanish, 6.6% spoke other Indo-European languages, 20.1% spoke Asian or Pacific Islander languages, and 1.2% spoke other languages. Of those aged 25 or older, 93.4% were high school graduates and 60.3% had a bachelor's degree.

The median household income in 2023 was $132,015, and the per capita income was $72,245. About 4.8% of families and 6.9% of the population were below the poverty line.

=== 2010 census ===
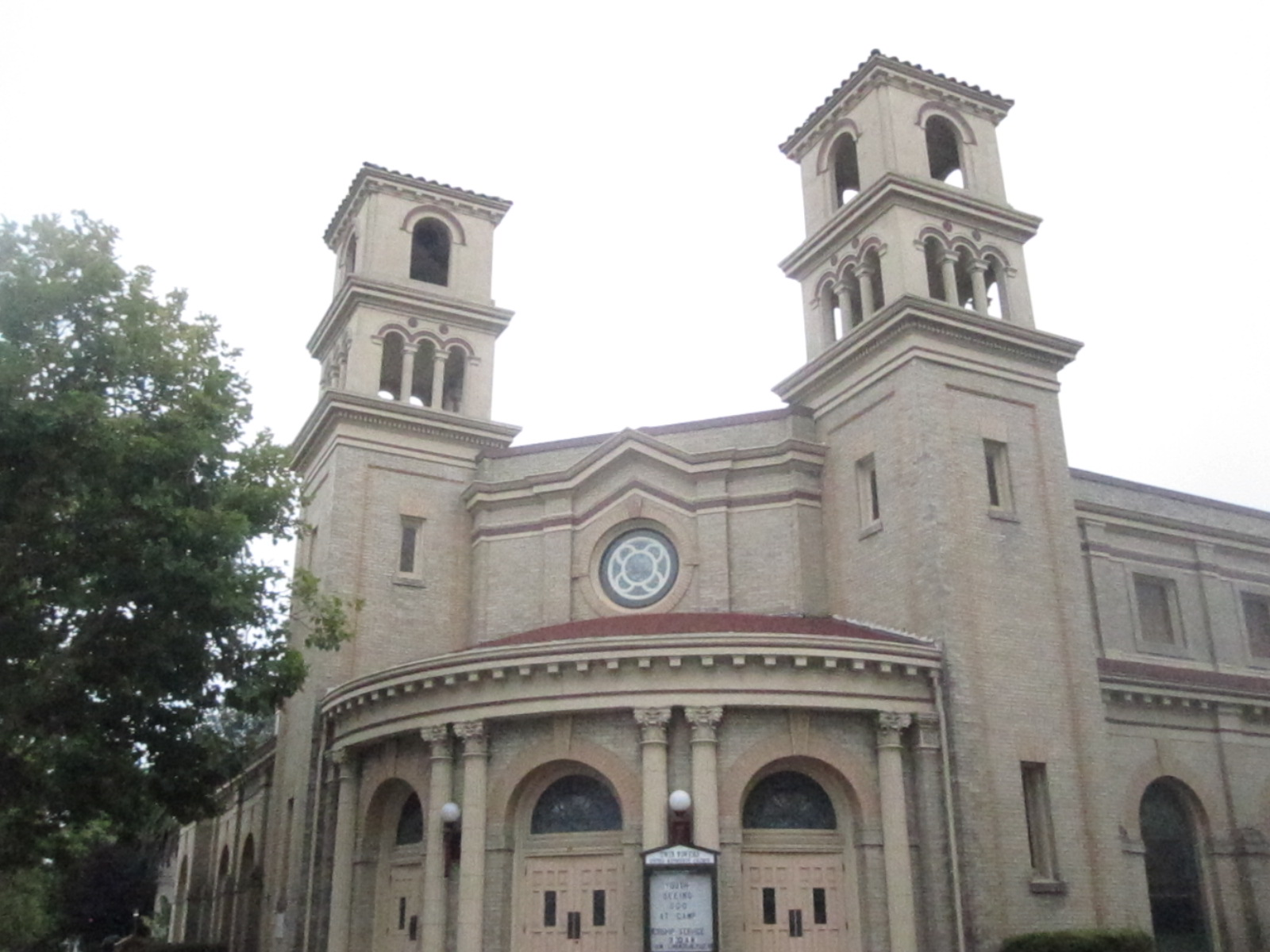
Twin Towers Church

The 2010 United States census reported that Alameda had a population of 73,812.

The population density was 3,214.9 inhabitants per square mile (1,241.3/km^{2}). The racial makeup of Alameda was 37,460 (50.8%) White, 23,058 (31.2%) Asian, 4,759 (6.4%) African American, 426 (0.6%) Native American, 381 (0.5%) Pacific Islander, 2,463 (3.3%) from other races, and 5,265 (7.1%) from two or more races. Hispanic or Latino of any race were 8,092 persons (11.0%).

The Census reported that 72,316 people (98.0% of the population) lived in households, 857 (1.2%) lived in non-institutionalized group quarters, and 639 (0.9%) were institutionalized.

There were 30,123 households, out of which 9,144 (30.4%) had children under the age of 18 living in them, 13,440 (44.6%) were opposite-sex married couples living together, 3,623 (12.0%) had a female householder with no husband present, 1,228 (4.1%) had a male householder with no wife present. There were 1,681 (5.6%) unmarried opposite-sex partnerships, and 459 (1.5%) same-sex married couples or same-sex partnerships. 9,347 households (31.0%) were made up of individuals, and 2,874 (9.5%) had someone living alone who was 65 years of age or older. The average household size was 2.40. There were 18,291 families (60.7% of all households); the average family size was 3.06.

The age distribution of the population shows 15,304 people (20.7%) under the age of 18, 5,489 people (7.4%) aged 18 to 24, 21,000 people (28.5%) aged 25 to 44, 22,044 people (29.9%) aged 45 to 64, and 9,975 people (13.5%) who were 65 years of age or older. The median age was 40.7 years. For every 100 females, there were 91.7 males. For every 100 females age 18 and over, there were 88.5 males.

Per capita annual income (in 2013 dollars) in 2009–2013 was $41,340 per the US Census. Median household income in 2009–2013 was $74,606 per the US Census.

There were 32,351 housing units at an average density of 1,409.0 per square mile (544.0/km^{2}), of which 30,123 were occupied, of which 14,488 (48.1%) were owner-occupied, and 15,635 (51.9%) were occupied by renters. The homeowner vacancy rate was 1.1%; the rental vacancy rate was 5.7%. 37,042 people (50.2% of the population) lived in owner-occupied housing units and 35,274 people (47.8%) lived in rental housing units.

There is a large Filipino community; and also a major Portuguese community, from which Tom Hanks' mother came and where Lyndsy Fonseca was raised for some time. Alameda also has a historic Japanese American community and had a small Japanese business district on a portion of Park Street before World War II, when the city's Japanese population was interned. A Japanese Buddhist church is one of the few remaining buildings left of Alameda's pre-war Japanese American community.

== Economy ==
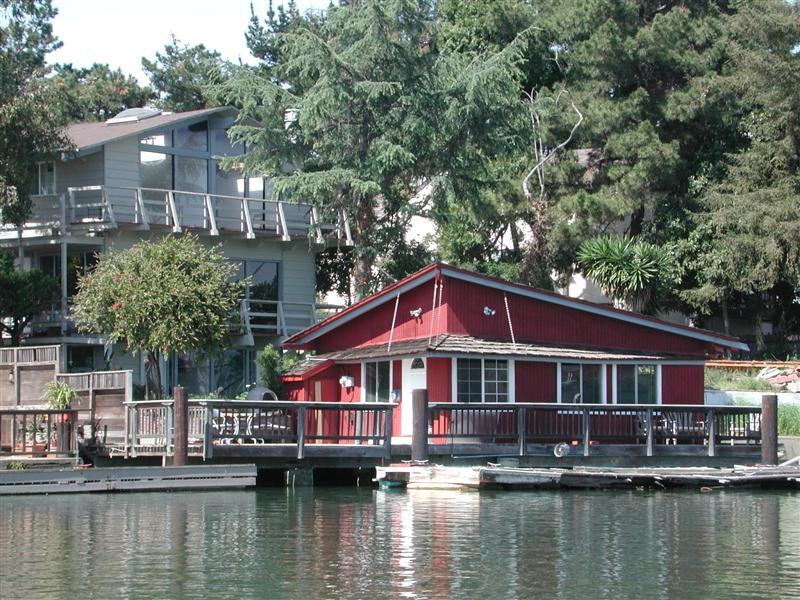
Waterfront homes in Alameda

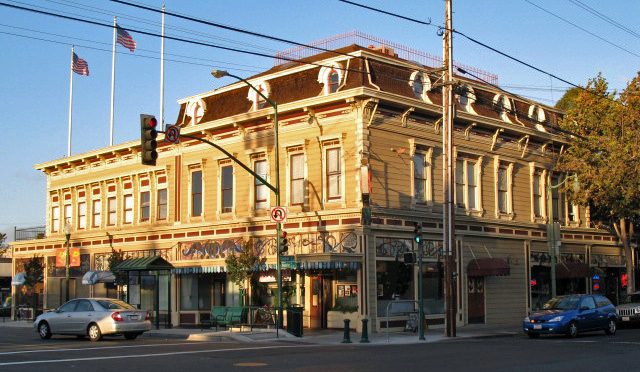
The Croll Building, built 1879

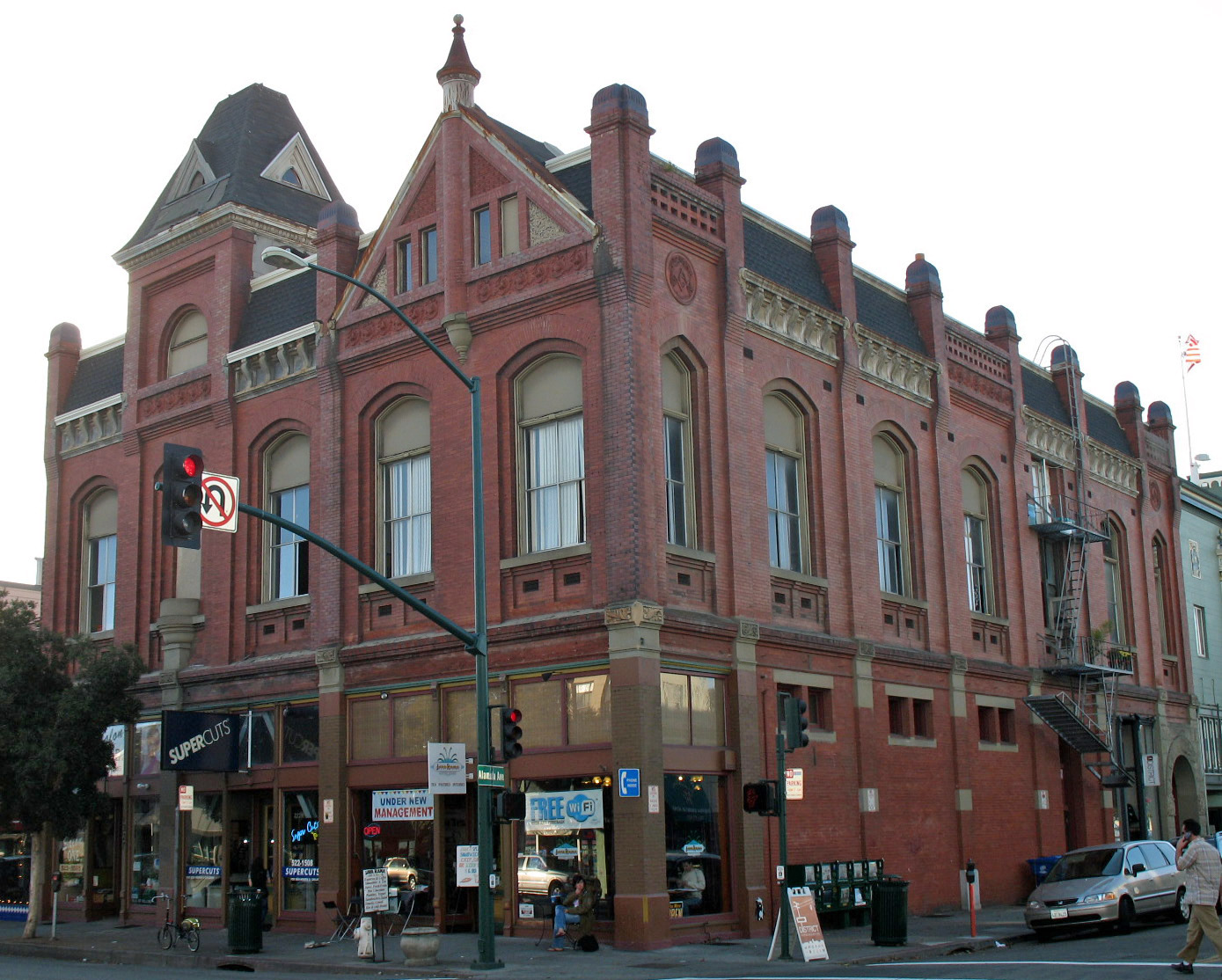
The Masonic Temple and Lodge

Top employers

According to the city's 2025 Annual Comprehensive Financial Report, the top employers in the city are:

#	Employer	# of Employees
1	Penumbra Inc.	1,848
2	Alameda Unified School District	1,695
3	Exelixis	749
4	Alameda Alliance For Health	670
5	City of Alameda	584
6	Sila Nanotechnologies	407
7	World Market Management Services	383
8	Safeway Stores	365
9	Bay Ship & Yacht Co.	340
10	Webcor Craft	295

Naval Air Station Alameda (NAS), decommissioned in 1997, was turned over to the City of Alameda for civilian development, today known as Alameda Point.

A cluster of artisan distilleries, wineries, breweries and tasting rooms along Monarch Street at Alameda Point is now referred to by the City of Alameda as "Spirits Alley". Admiral Maltings also sits in this area, supplying craft brewers and whisky producers, and is the first craft malting house in California.

== Arts and culture ==
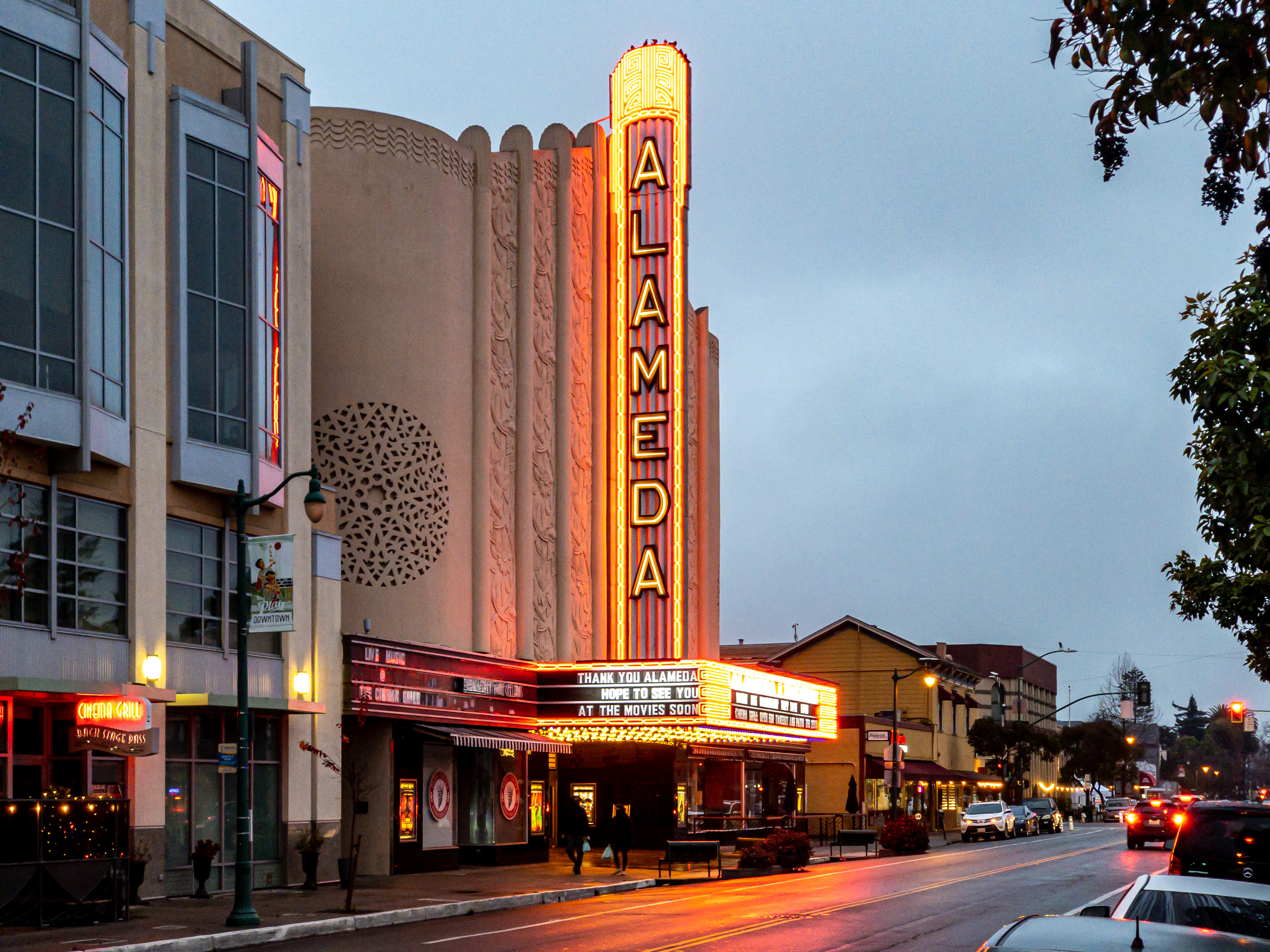
Alameda Theatre

=== Arts ===
Photo-realist Robert Bechtle has painted numerous Alameda subjects, including Alameda Gran Torino, which was acquired by the San Francisco Museum of Modern Art in 1974 and remains one of Bechtle's most famous works.

=== Theaters ===
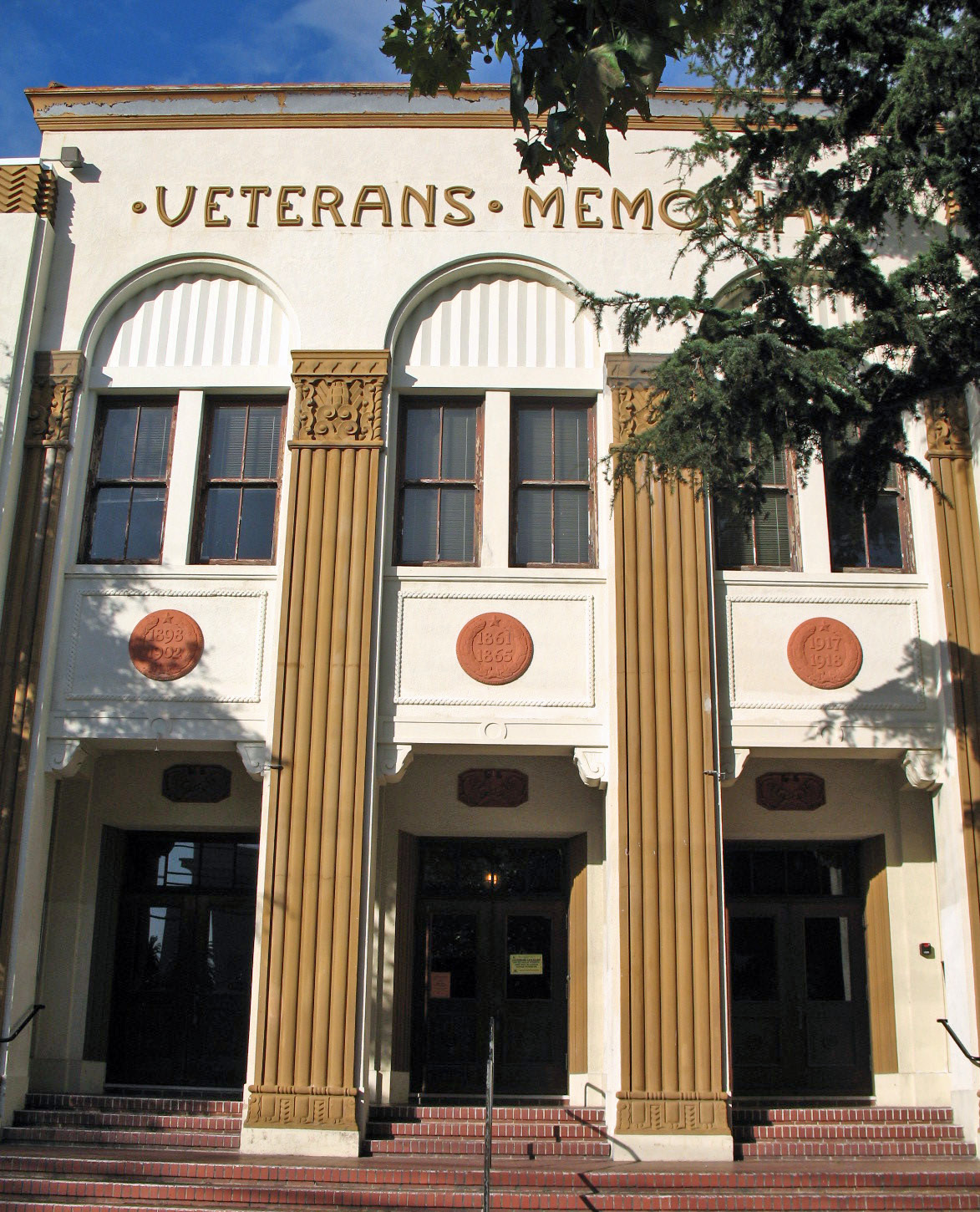
Veterans Memorial Building

The landmark Alameda Theatre is an Art Deco movie theatre designed by architect Timothy L. Pflueger and opened up in 1932. The city restored and expand it to include a theater multiplex. The public opening was May 21, 2008.

The Altarena Playhouse, which performs comedies, dramas, and musicals, was founded in 1938 and is the longest continuously operating community theater in the San Francisco Bay Area.

Radium is a planned performing arts complex at the former naval air station and has seasonal shows in an outdoor theater.

=== Festivals ===
The Fourth of July parade is advertised as the longest in the United States. It features homemade floats, classic cars, motorized living room furniture, fire-breathing dragons, and marching bands.

There are multiple major events when streets in Alameda's historic downtown district are closed to vehicular traffic. Park Street Art and Wine Faire is the biggest and takes place the last weekend of every July with more than 200 artists and vendors. Seasonal events like the spring and winter markets, as well as themed rum, whiskey and hot cocoa strolls are spread out through the year.

The annual Sand Castle and Sculpture Contest takes place in June at the Robert Crown Memorial State Beach, attracting hundreds of participants. The first contest was held in 1967.

Alameda Point Antiques Faire is held on the first Sunday of every month at the former Naval Air Station runways. It is the largest antiques and collectibles show in Northern California, attracting upwards of 10,000 visitors and featuring 800 dealer booths. The faire specializes in items 20 years or older, including furniture, decorations, clothing, jewelry, art, pottery, books, and collectibles.

=== Museums ===
- Alameda Museum – includes exhibits about the history and culture the city with old dioramas, model ships, toys, Native American culture, and Neptune Beach.
- Alameda Naval Air Museum – is focused on the history of Naval Air Station Alameda and aviation.
- California Historical Radio Society Museum – set in a 125 year old telephone building, the museum covers electronic communication with artifacts from the late 1800s on display.
- Pacific Pinball Museum – an interactive museum/arcade with a chronological and historical selection of rare and early pinball games including a rotating set of more than 100 playable pinball machines ranging in era from the 1940s to present day located on Webster Street.
- USS Hornet Museum – a museum ship of the aircraft carrier USS Hornet. It has been moored at the former Naval Air Station as since 1998.

== Government ==
United States presidential election results for Alameda, California
Year	Republican		Democratic		Third party(ies)	
Year	No.	%	No.	%	No.	%
2000	7,531	26.01%	19,517	67.41%	1,906	6.58%
2004	7,698	23.96%	23,981	74.65%	444	1.38%
2008	7,290	20.55%	27,449	77.39%	731	2.06%
2012	6,339	18.50%	26,954	78.65%	979	2.86%
2016	5,129	13.51%	30,696	80.85%	2,141	5.64%
2020	6,634	15.00%	36,686	82.94%	911	2.06%
2024	6,506	16.35%	31,843	80.02%	1,445	3.63%

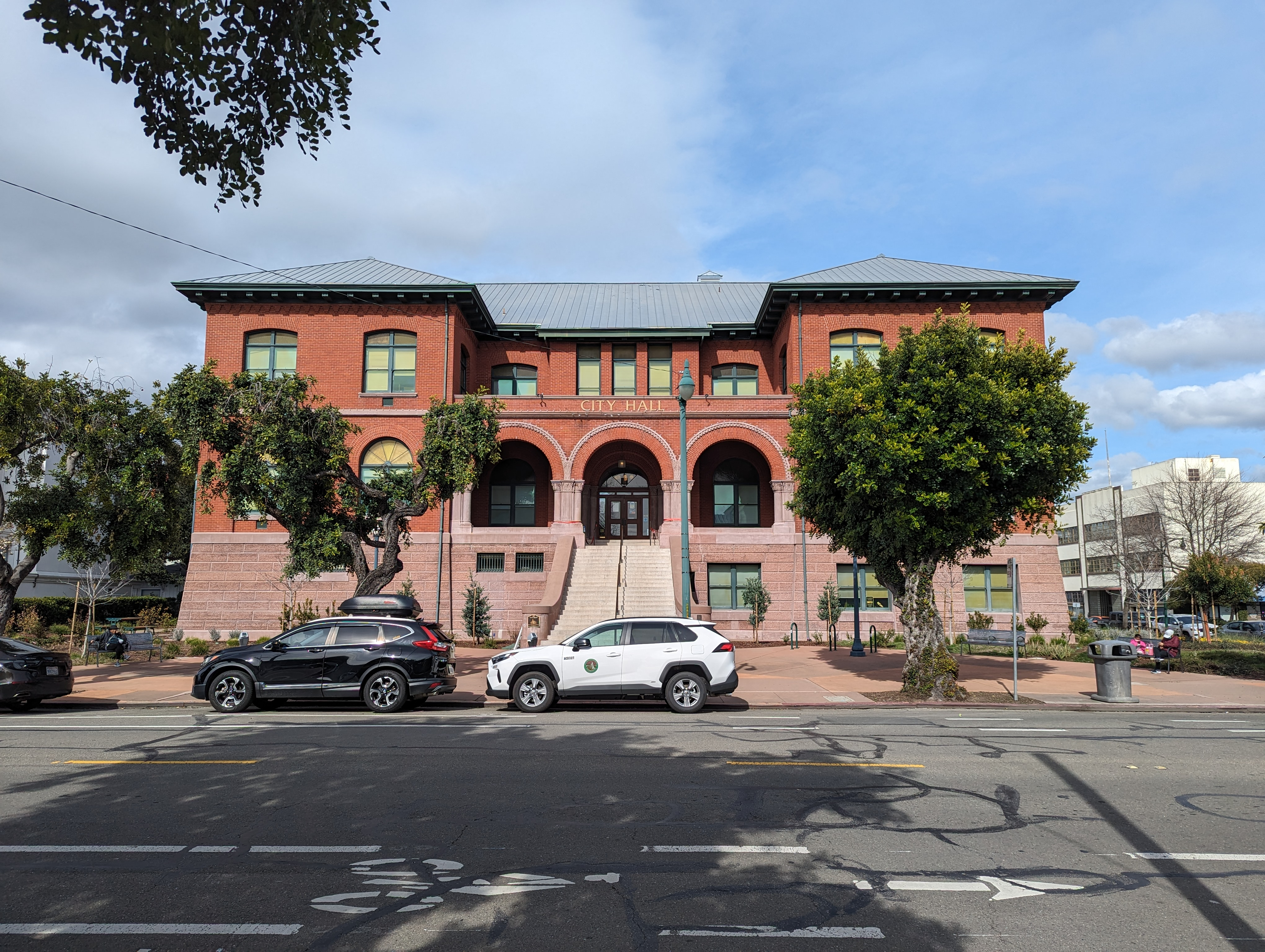
Alameda City Hall

Alameda is a charter city governed by a five-member City Council, including the Mayor, who are all elected at large. The city operates under a council-manager system defined by the City Charter, with a professional City Manager overseeing daily administration. The City Manager is responsible for city operations, budget administration, and implementing council policies, distinguishing Alameda from strong-mayor systems often in bigger cities. The City Attorney and City Clerk report directly to the council. As of 2026, Marilyn Ezzy Ashcraft serves as mayor, being elected in 2018 and re-elected in 2022.

The budget for the city is greater than $310 million a year as of the 2023–25 biannual budgets planning cycle. The City Treasurer and City Auditor are independently elected. Residents appointed by the Mayor and City Council serve on a range of boards and commissions overseeing major components of the city (for example recreation and parks, library, transportation and planning).

Alameda's government is responsible for a range of municipal services, including public safety, transportation, parks, and land use planning. Rare to a city of its size, it operates its own city-wide electricity utility, Alameda Municipal Power.

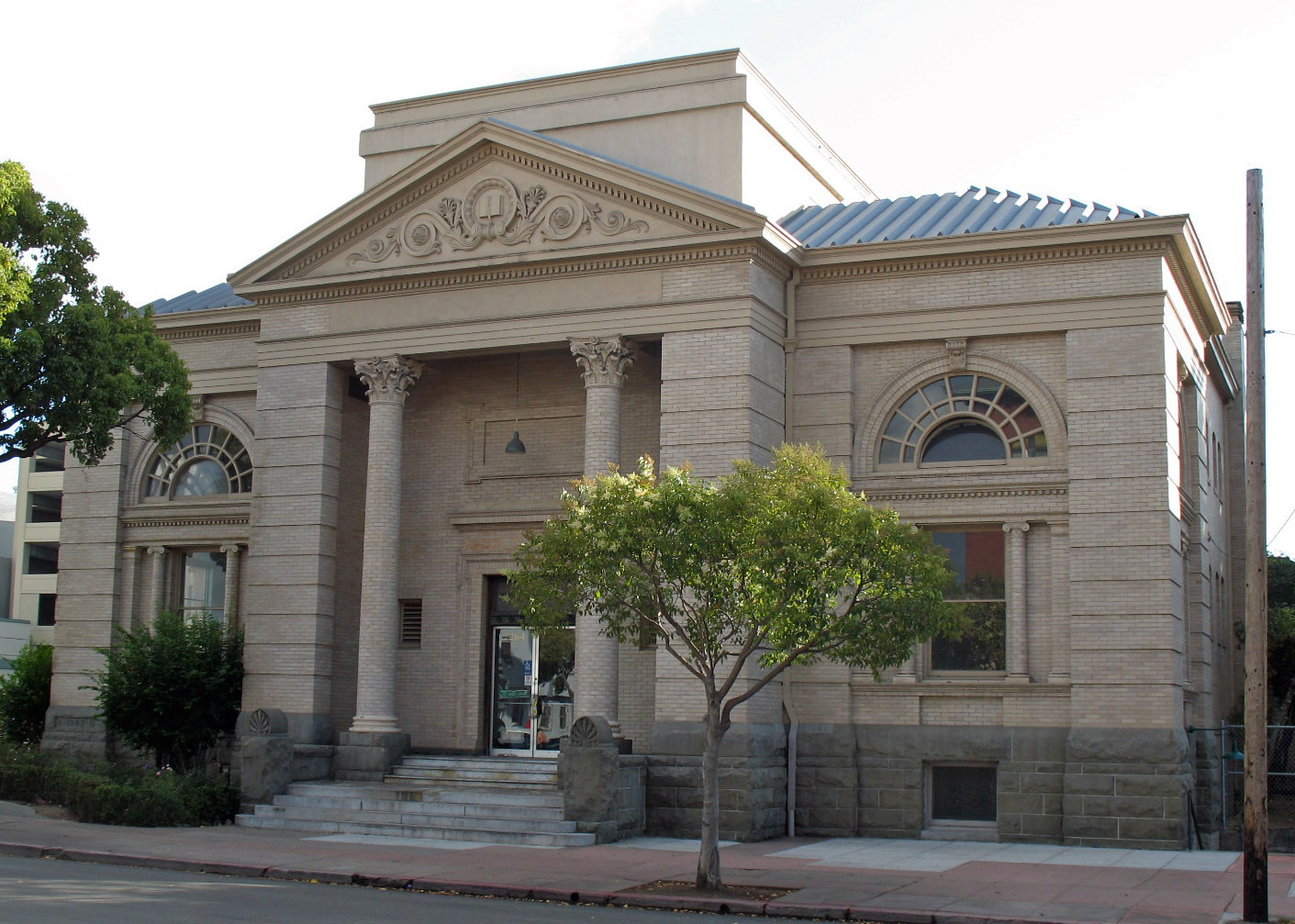
Alameda Carnegie Library

=== Alameda Free Library ===
Alameda operates Alameda Free Library, which consists of three branches: the Main Library in downtown Alameda, the Bay Farm Island Library, and the West End Library. Beyond books, services at the library include events and author talks, computer labs, home delivery of books, as well as e-book, streaming digital media, and audio book catalogs. Historical resources of Alameda's past include local newspaper and magazine archives, high school yearbooks, books by local authors, and maps.

In 2000 voters authorized a bond measure to construct a new main library to replace the city's Carnegie library, damaged during the 1989 Loma Prieta earthquake. The city also received state funds for the new main library and opened the doors to the new facility in November 2006.

== Education ==
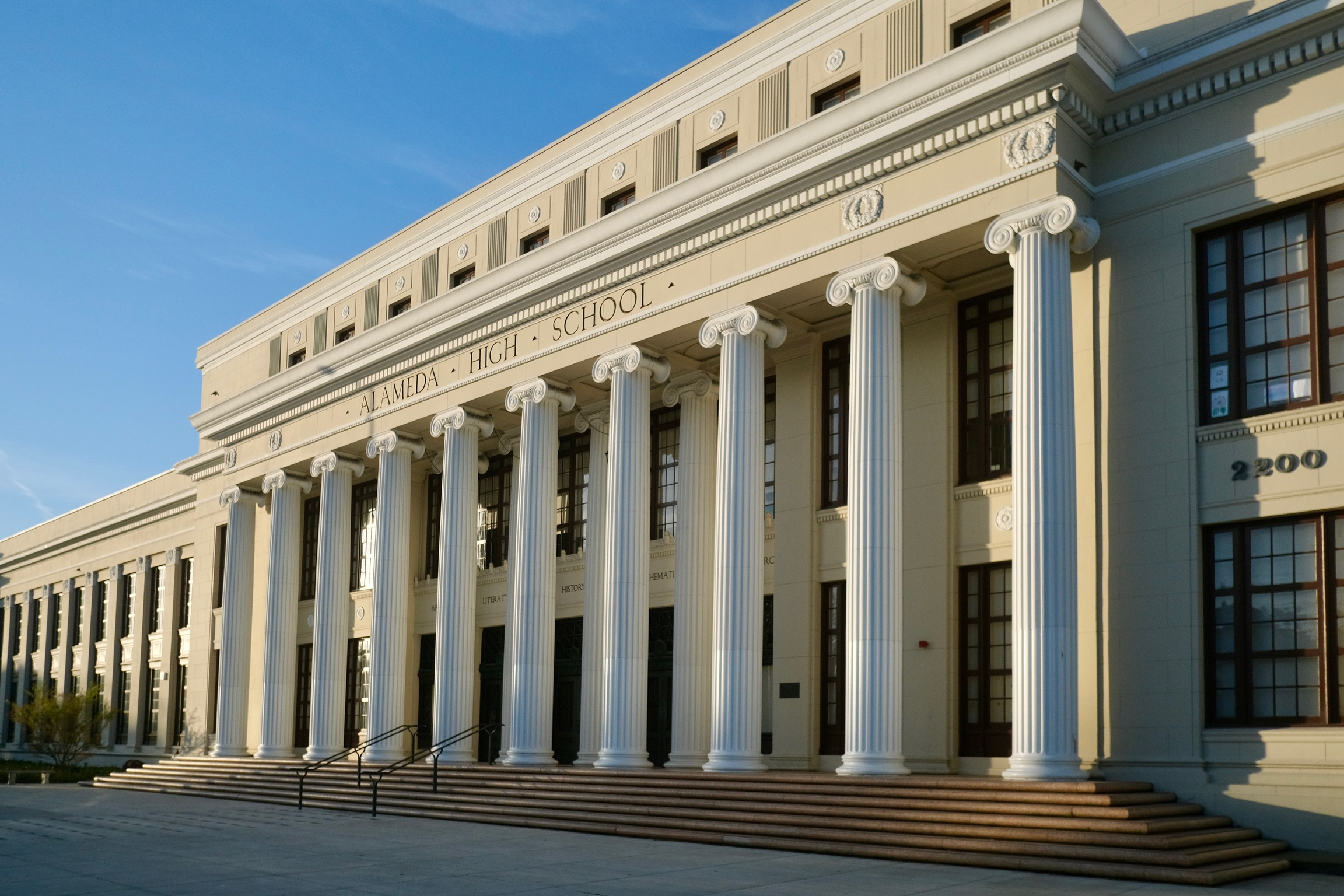
Alameda High School

Public primary and secondary education in Alameda is the responsibility of the Alameda Unified School District (AUSD), which is legally separate from the City of Alameda government (as is common throughout California). More than 9,000 students are enrolled in the AUSD system across nine elementary, four middle, four high schools. The California Department of Education School Dashboard reports student performance is "green" and above state standards for English, math and college/career preparation.

The College of Alameda, a two-year community college is part of the Peralta Community College District. The city has numerous private primary schools, and one private high school, St. Joseph Notre Dame High School, a Catholic school.

== Media ==
The community is currently served by a non-profit online news outlet called the Alameda Post. Additionally, a weekly newspaper section of the East Bay Times, the Alameda Journal, is published by the Bay Area News Group, based in Walnut Creek, CA.

Alameda's first newspaper, the Encinal, appeared in the 1860s. Following the Encinal, several other papers appeared along geographic lines, and the Daily Argus eventually rose to prominence. Around 1900, the Daily Argus began to fade in importance and east and west papers The Times and The Star combined to take the leading role as the Alameda Times-Star in the 1930s. The Times-Star was sold to the Alameda Newspaper Group in the 1970s. In 1997, the Hills Newspaper chain was bought by Knight Ridder. Between 2001 and 2023, the Alameda Sun ran a local weekly print newspaper.

== Transportation ==
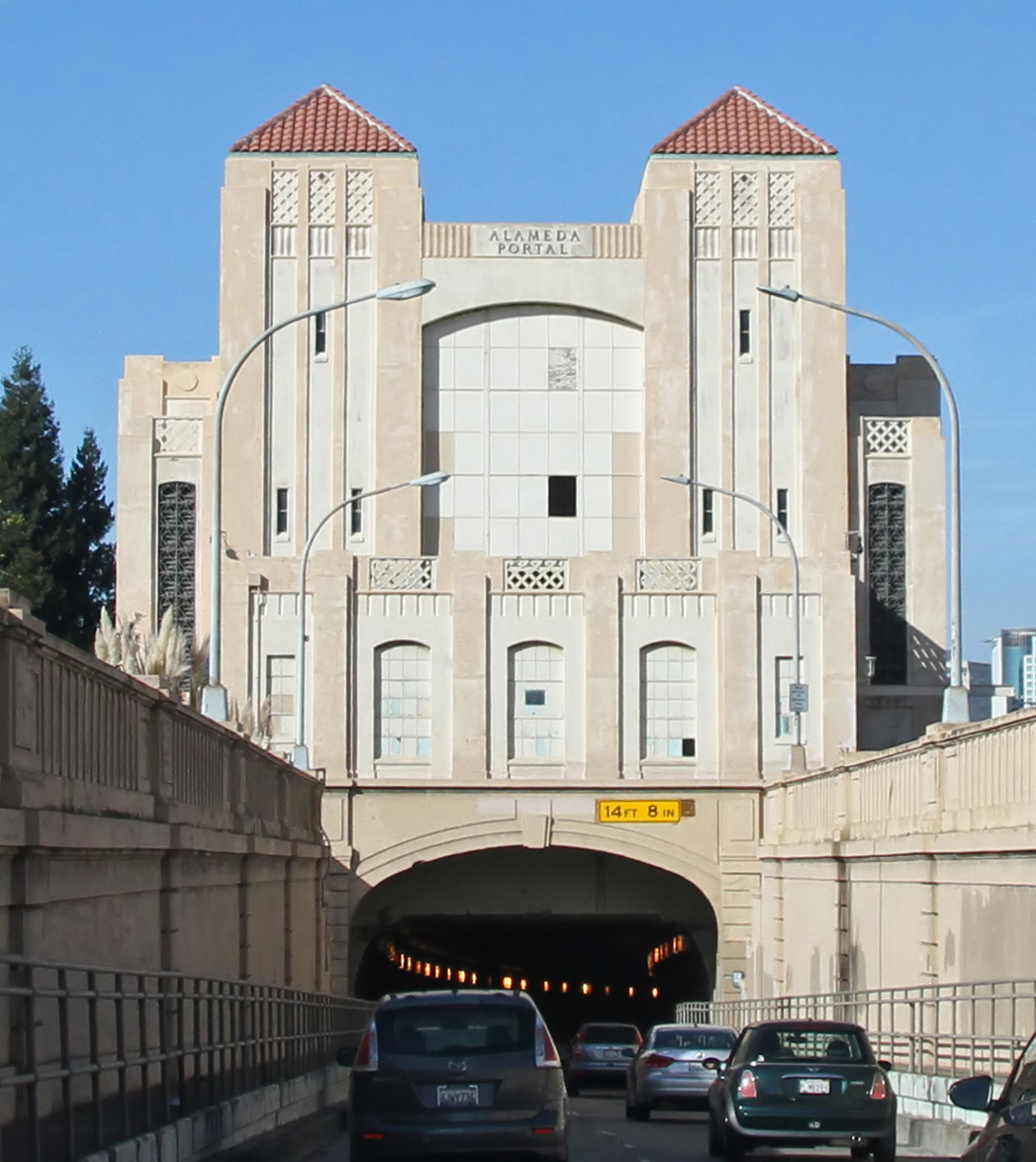
Alameda Portal of the Posey and Webster Street Tubes

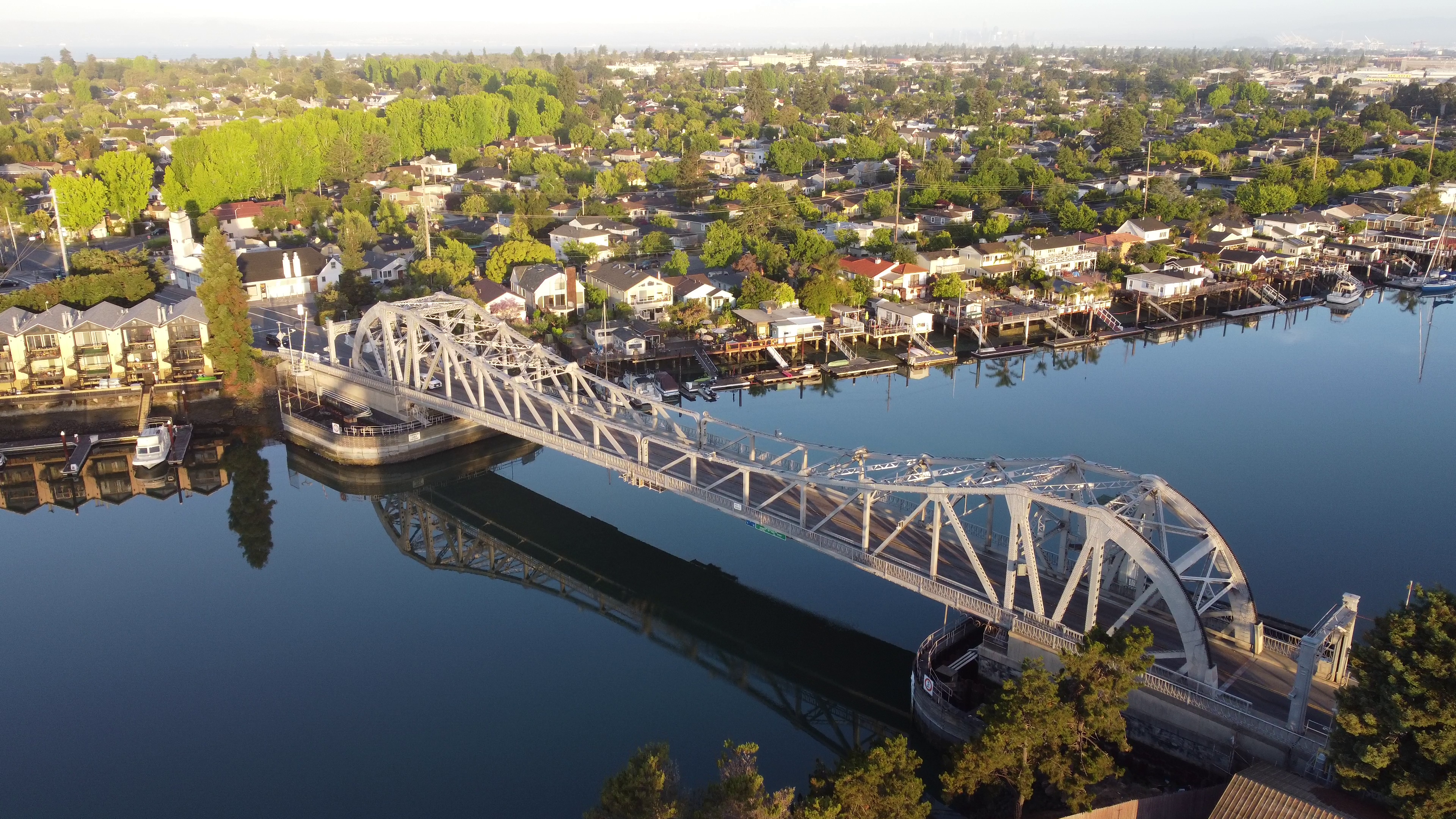
High Street Bridge

Alameda Island and connections:
1. Posey and Webster Street tubes
2. Park Street Bridge
3. Fruitvale Bridge
4. High Street Bridge
5. Bay Farm Island Bridge

Alameda is well connected to the region via road, ferries and nearby rail and air connections.

Vehicle access to Alameda Island is via three bridges from Oakland (Park Street, Fruitvale Avenue, and High Street Bridges), as well as the two one-way Posey and Webster Street Tubes leading into Oakland's Chinatown. Alameda and Bay Farm Islands are connected via the Bay Farm Island Bridge, and the Bay Farm Island Bicycle Bridge (the only pedestrian/bicycle-only drawbridge in the United States).

California State Route 61 runs down city streets from the Posey and Webster Street Tubes, across the Bay Farm Island Bridge, and south to the Oakland Airport. The island is just minutes off Interstate 880 in Oakland. The speed limit for the city is 25 mph (40 km/h) on almost every road.

Transportation options include:

- Bus – AC Transit connects the island to Oakland and Berkeley, and express service to downtown San Francisco's Salesforce Transit Center.
- Ferry – San Francisco Bay Ferry connects Alameda with San Francisco across four routes; three on the main island's west end Alameda Main St./Oakland Ferry, Alameda Seaplane Lagoon Ferry, Alameda/South San Francisco and from Bay Farm Island via the Alameda Harbor Bay Ferry routes.
- Water Shuttle – The Oakland Alameda Water Shuttle is pedestrian/bike boat that connects Alameda Landing and Oakland's Jack London Square runs five days a week for free.
- BART and Rail – The closest BART stations are Lake Merritt and 12th Street, near the exit to the Posey Tube, and Fruitvale, near the Fruitvale Bridge. BART's long-term plans for a second tunnel include Alameda as a candidate for the first stop on a new East Bay line. The closest Amtrak rail station is Oakland-Jack London Square.
- Air – Oakland International Airport abuts the eastern border of Alameda's Bay Farm Island, and includes passenger, freight and private aircraft flights.

== Notable buildings ==
- Alameda City Hall; NRHP-listed
- Alameda High School; NRHP-listed
- Croll Building; NRHP-listed and a California Historical Landmark
- Masonic Temple and Lodge; NRHP-listed, and part of the Park Street Historic Commercial District
- Park Street Historic Commercial District; NRHP-listed and a California Historical Landmark

== Notable people ==
- Norman Allinger, an American organic and computational chemist and Distinguished Research Professor Emeritus was born in Alameda.
- Albert Arents, a mining engineer who helped develop mineral resources of the Rocky Mountains.
- John Baker, MLB catcher for San Diego Padres and Chicago Cubs, was born in Alameda.
- Clinton Ballou (1923–2021), biochemist, died in Alameda.
- Hester A. Benedict (1838–1921), president, Pacific Coast Women's Press Association
- John W. Bones (1818–1901), architect, State Senator and first elected official of the Workingmen's Party of California.
- Mike Brisiel, an offensive guard for Oakland Raiders.
- Virginia Lee Burton, Caldecott-winning children's author and illustrator.
- Harold Camping, television and radio personality, president and general manager of Family Stations, Inc.
- Phyllis Diller, television comedian, attended Sunday school at First Presbyterian, married and lived in Alameda at the start of her comedy career in San Francisco in the 1950s.
- General James Doolittle, who received the Medal of Honor for his bombing of Japan during World War II; Doolittle was born in Alameda in 1896.
- Garrett Eckbo, landscape architect who lived in Alameda as a child, later forming the Bay Area firm of Eckbo, Royston, Williams with Robert Royston and Edward Williams.
- Leif Erickson, actor, born in Alameda in 1911.
- Larry Eustachy, college basketball coach, born in Alameda.
- Geoffrey Kent Ferguson, mass-murderer, perpetrator in the killings of five men in Redding, Connecticut, born in Alameda.
- Debbi Fields, founder of Mrs. Fields Cookies, attended Alameda High School, where she was a cheerleader.
- Albert Ghiorso, nuclear scientist, co-discoverer of 12 chemical elements on the periodic table; in Guinness Book of World Records for Most Elements Discovered.
- Brad Gillis, guitarist with Night Ranger, a San Francisco rock band formed in the 1980s.
- Katharine Graham, the late publisher of The Washington Post, lived in Alameda as a child, according to Personal History, her autobiography.
- Tim Hardaway Jr., a professional basketball player, was born in Alameda.
- Horace Heidt, bandleader and radio personality, born in Alameda on May 21, 1901.
- Emily Heller, comedian
- Marielle Heller, actress and director
- Bruce Henderson, author, grew up in Alameda, according to his book Hero Found: The Greatest POW Escape of the Vietnam War.
- Benjamin Jealous, former President of the NAACP, lived in Alameda.
- Joseph R. Knowland, congressman and Alameda native, was editor and publisher of the Oakland Tribune.
- William Fife Knowland, U.S. Senator, was student body president at Alameda High School.
- Robert L. Lippert, theater chain owner and film producer, was an Alameda native.
- Paul Mantz, air racer and Hollywood stunt pilot, was born in Alameda in 1903.
- Louis A. McCall Sr., drummer and musician known as the co-founder of Con Funk Shun.
- Margaret McNamara, founder of Reading is Fundamental, and wife of Robert McNamara, grew up in Alameda.
- Jerry Miley, film actor, who played as the murdered heir Allen Colby in the film Charlie Chan's Secret, born in Alameda.
- George P. Miller, a congressman from 1945 to 1973.
- Jack Mingo, author
- Hugo Wilhelm Arthur Nahl, designer of the Seal of California.
- Don Perata, former President Pro Tempore of California State Senate, lives in Alameda; once taught at Saint Joseph Notre Dame High, Encinal High, and Alameda High, among other Alameda schools.
- Emily Browne Powell (1847–1938), writer; president, Pacific Coast Women's Press Association
- Carl Ravazza, bandleader, born in Alameda, 1910.
- Bill Rigney, Major League Baseball player and manager, was born in Alameda.
- Dutch Ruether, pitcher for 1927 New York Yankees, was born in Alameda.
- Jane Sibbett, actress and comedian, grew up in Alameda.
- Operatic mezzo-soprano Frederica Von Stade has lived in Alameda since 1992.
- Sharon Tate, actress, resident in early to late-1960s.
- Charles Lee Tilden, for whom Tilden Regional Park is named, was a longtime resident of Alameda; Tilden Way at the southeast end of the city is named for him.
- Baseball Hall of Famer Willie Stargell, MLB player Tommy Harper, MLB player Curtell Howard Motton, 2003 National League Rookie of the Year Dontrelle Willis, 2007 National League Most Valuable Player Jimmy Rollins, NBA player J.R. Rider, and NFL player Junior Tautalatasi all attended Encinal High School.
- Jason Kidd (NBA player and coach) and Joe Nelson (MLB pitcher) attended St. Joseph Notre Dame High School in Alameda.
- MLB players Ray French, Johnny Vergez, Andy Carey, Bill Serena, Erik Schullstrom, Dick Bartell, Duffy Lewis, Chris Speier, and Bryan Woo all attended Alameda High School.
- Many people from naval families, including celebrities such as Ann Curry, Jack Haven, Tom Hanks, and Jim Morrison of The Doors, have lived in Alameda.

== Sister cities ==
The city has four active and formal sister city relations as well as inactive ones.

- Dumaguete, Philippines (2015)
- Jiangyin, China (2008)
- Varazze, Italy (2019)
- Yeongdong-gun, South Korea (2017)

=== Friendship city ===
- Wuxi, China
  - A Friendship city since 2004, because the diplomacy organization Sister Cities International does not recognize the relationship.

=== Inactive cities ===
- Arita, Japan
- Lidingö, Sweden
  - Initiated in 1959 as part of President Eisenhower's people-to-people-movement, whose purpose was to develop better understanding among people from different countries after World War II. Both Alameda and Lidingö are islands with a bridge connecting them to a big city.

== See also ==
- Alameda Island
- Bay Farm Island
- Coast Guard Island
- List of islands of California
- List of ships built in Alameda, California
