= High Street Bridge =

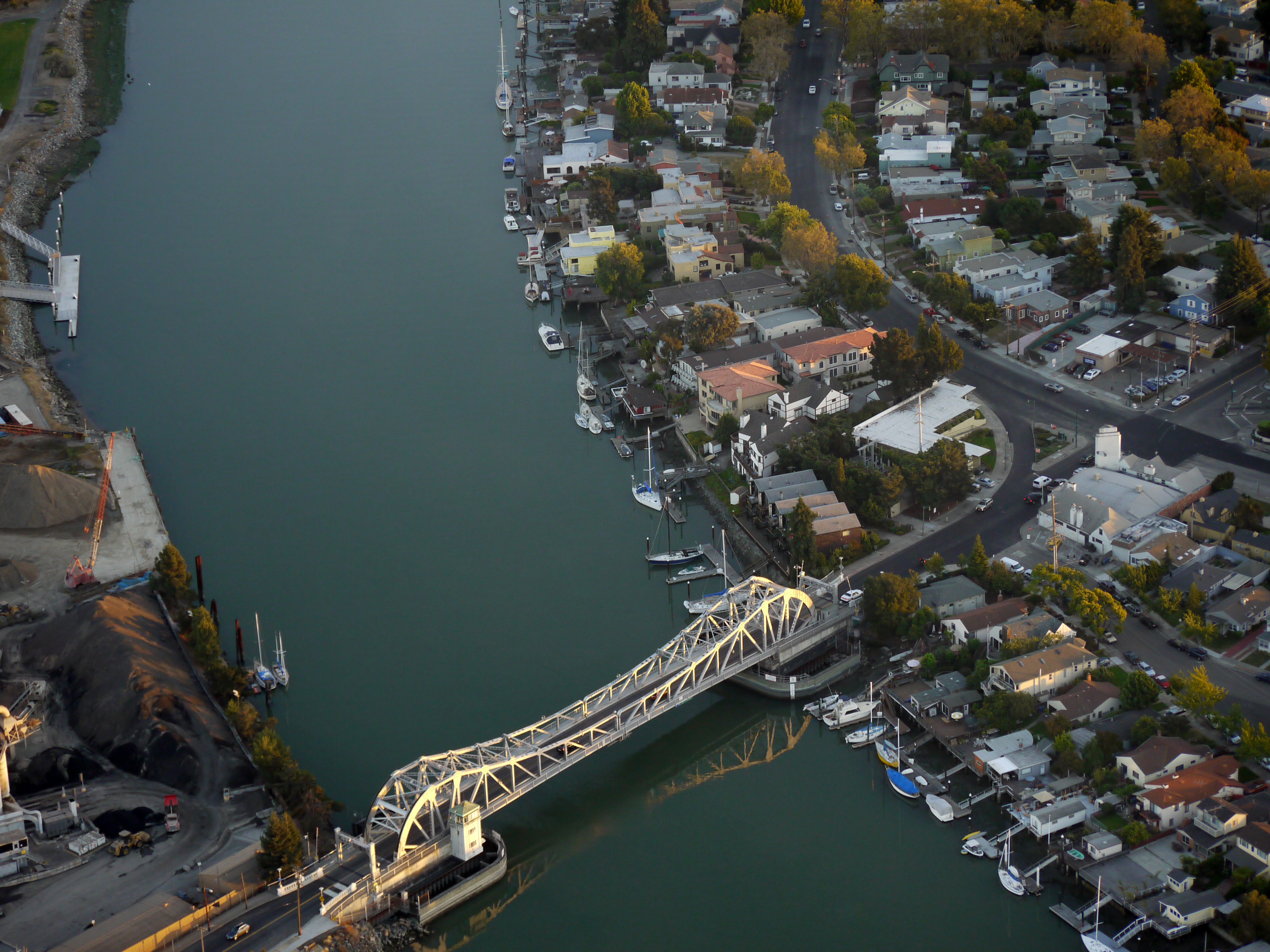
- Aerial view in 2010
- Coordinates: 37.7645°N 122.2250°W
- Carries: Cars and trucks on High Street
- Crosses: Oakland Estuary
- Locale: San Francisco Bay Area

Characteristics
- Design: Double-leaf bascule
- Material: Steel
- Total length: 250 ft (76 m)
- Width: 37 ft (11 m) overall 24 ft (7.3 m) roadway 6 ft (1.8 m) sidewalk
- Clearance above: 15 ft 6 in (4.72 m)
- Clearance below: 14 ft 6 in (4.42 m) (high tide); 21 ft (6.4 m) (low tide)
- No. of lanes: 2

History
- Constructed by: Harrison Bridge Company
- Opened: 1894, December 1939
- Rebuilt: 1901, 1939

Statistics
- Daily traffic: 30,000

Location
- Interactive map of High Street Bridge

The High Street Bridge is a double-leaf bascule drawbridge spanning 296 feet of the Oakland Estuary in the San Francisco Bay Area, California, United States. It links the cities of Oakland and Alameda. The bridge is opened approximately 1,400 times annually and carries an average of 26,000 vehicles per year. It was built when the Oakland Estuary was trenched, converting Alameda from a peninsula to an island.

The High Street Bridge is one of the four bridges and two tunnels that allow access to Alameda.

== History ==
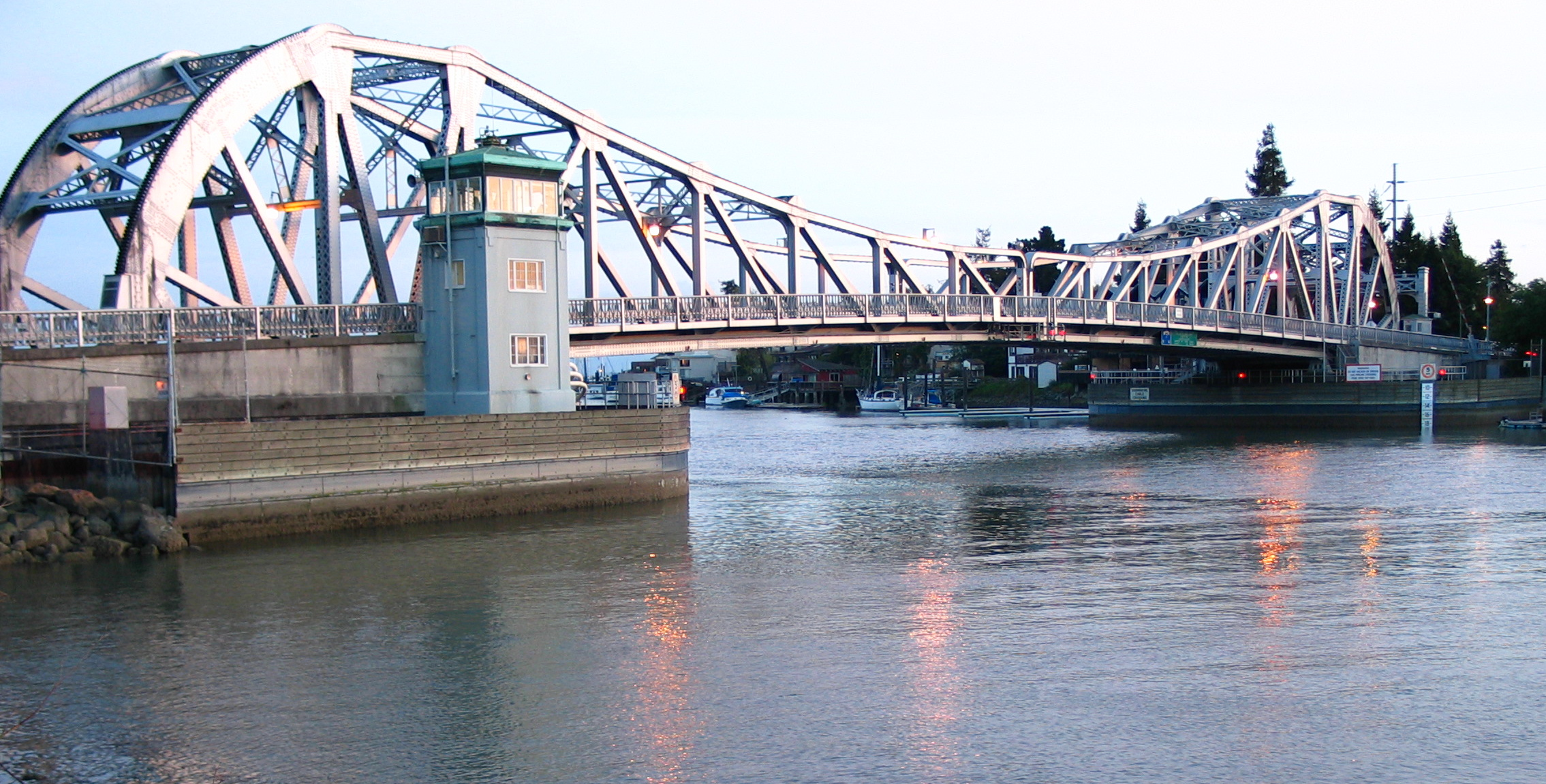
The bridge in 2003

The estuary was originally spanned by an iron swing bridge, completed in 1894 by the Harrison Bridge Company for $24,747. In May 1901, a fire destroyed the swing span and part of the approaches, which were rebuilt the following year. Three bridges were built by the federal government in 1901 at High Street (road), Park Street (road), and Fruitvale Avenue (combined road and rail) in exchange for permission and rights-of-way to dredge the channel between San Antonio Creek and San Leandro Bay.

After the three bridges were completed, they were left closed to allow road and rail traffic to pass, but never opened for marine traffic. The northern approach to the High Street Bridge was destroyed by a fire in May 1909, which also damaged the bridge; repairs were performed late in 1909. After pressure was applied by Senator George Clement Perkins and Congressman Joseph R. Knowland, the federal government turned the bridges over to Alameda County in 1910, conditioned on the county assuming responsibility for maintenance, staffing, and operation.

The present bridge was designed by the County of Alameda Surveyors Office and constructed under the Federal WPA Program in 1939 at a cost of $750,000. It opened in December 1939.

The bascule bridge was modernized in 1981 and 1996. The 1981 project included upgrades to electrical systems and motors; the 1996 project completely repainted the bridge, removing over 25,000 pounds (11,000 kg) of lead-based paint.

== Design ==
The bridge normally opens both leaves to 45°, which accommodates most marine traffic; the maximum opening for each leaf is 76°. It is designed to safely operate in wind speeds of up to 30 miles per hour (48 km/h).

Each leaf may be operated independently, allowing marine traffic to pass in case one leaf is inoperable. Each leaf has a 75-horsepower (56 kW) main motor using electricity from Alameda Municipal Power, and a 5-horsepower (3.7 kW) emergency motor for each leaf is powered from Pacific Gas and Electric; using counterweights, full operation is possible using emergency power.
