= Albert Arents =

German-American metallurgist (1840–1914)

- Born: March 14, 1840; Clausthal, Kingdom of Prussia
- Died: May 13, 1914 (aged 74); Alameda, California
- Occupation: metallurgist

Albert Arents (March 14, 1840, Clausthal, Kingdom of Prussia – May 13, 1914) was a Prussian-born American metallurgist. He was one of a group of German-trained mining engineers who helped develop the mineral assets of the Rocky Mountains. He worked primarily with lead. He is chiefly known for his inventions.

== Biography ==
He was educated at University of Berlin and the mining school in Clausthal. After coming to the United States in 1865 to work in a small lead mine in Hampden County, Massachusetts, [2][3], headed for the western U.S. in 1866 [1]. Here he was variously occupied as superintendent of mining, metallurgical mills, and smelters in Arizona, California, Colorado, Nevada, and Utah. He contributed technical papers to the Transactions of the American Institute of Mining Engineers, having been elected a member of that society in 1882. Among his inventions are the siphon tap, used on lead furnaces; the Eureka lead furnace, extensively employed throughout Colorado and Utah; and a roasting furnace that bears his name. At his death, he resided in Alameda, California, where he had moved around 1880.
