= Croll Building =

Building in California, United States

- U.S. National Register of Historic Places
- California Historical Landmark
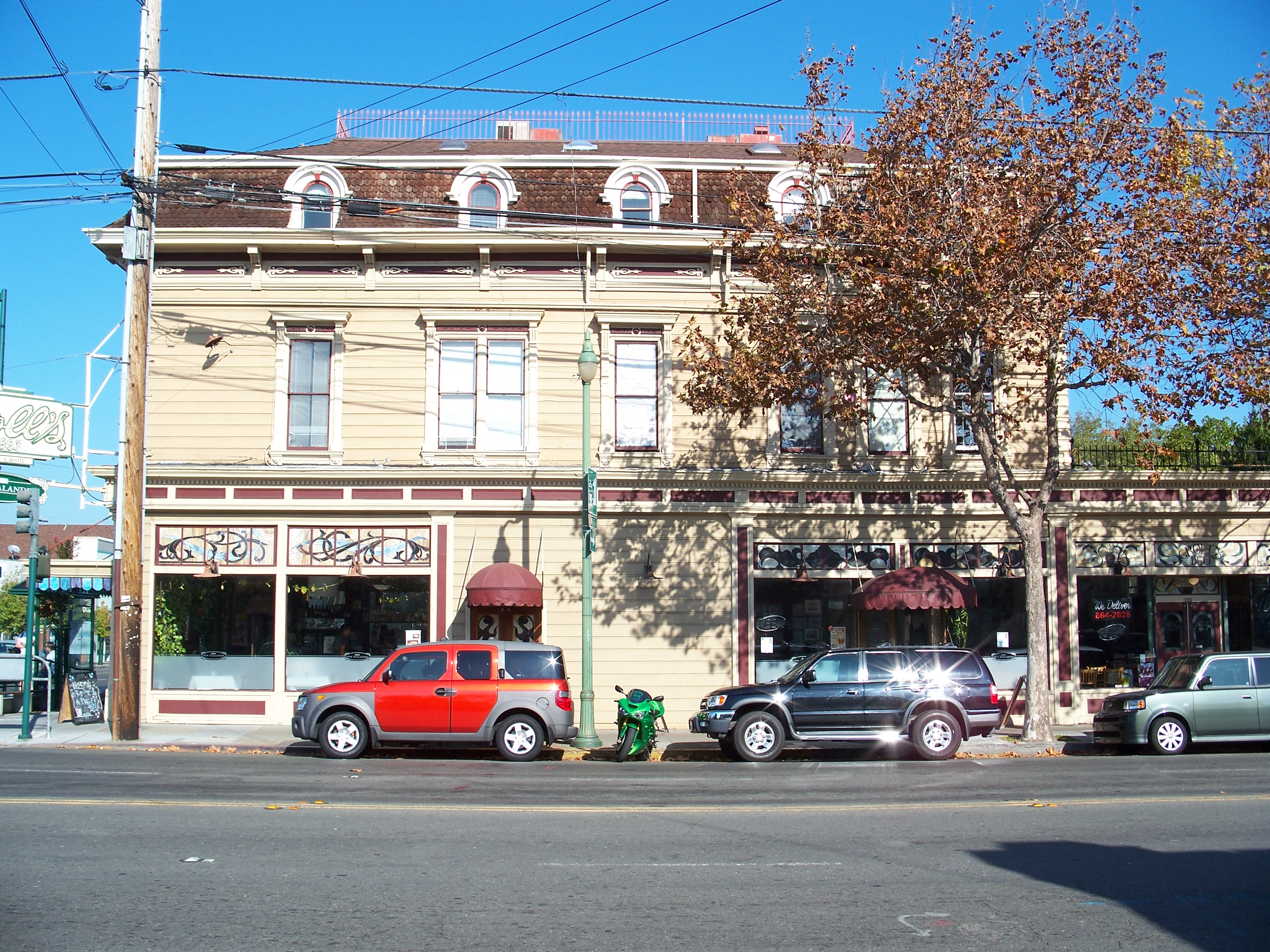

- Location within Oakland, California Location within California Location within the United States
- Location: 1400 Webster St., Alameda, California
- Coordinates: 37°46′17.86″N 122°16′35.71″W
- Built: 1879
- Architectural style: Second Empire, Italianate
- NRHP reference No.: 82000960
- CHISL No.: 954

Significant dates
- Added to NRHP: October 4, 1982
- Designated CHISL: January 14, 1983

The Croll Building, in Alameda, California, was the site of Croll's Gardens and Hotel, famous as training quarters for some of the greatest fighters in boxing history from 1883 to 1914. James J. Corbett, Bob Fitzsimmons, Jim Jefferies, Jack Johnson, and many other champions all stayed and trained here.

Today this building is home to 1400 Bar & Grill. The stained glass, elaborate etched windows, and carved wooden bar remain as they were when Neptune Beach was a popular attraction.

The second floor of the building is currently a residential hotel, with the third floor of the building being office space.

The building is registered as California Historical Landmark; and is listed on the National Register of Historic Places (NPS-82000960). It is located at the corner of Webster Street and Central Avenue. A large "Croll's" neon sign marks the location.

== See also ==
- National Register of Historic Places listings in Alameda County, California
