= Fernside, Alameda, California =

Fernside
- Location within Northern California
- Coordinates: 37°45′55″N 122°13′44″W
- Country: United States
- State: California
- County: Alameda
- Established: 1864
- Elevation: 16 ft (5 m)
- Time zone: UTC−8 (Pacific (PST))
  - Summer (DST): UTC−7 (PDT)
- GNIS feature ID: 1670741

Fernside is a neighborhood of Alameda in Alameda County, California. It lies at an elevation of 13 feet (4 m). Located near the Fruitvale and High Street bridges, it previously contained one train line which passed over the Fruitvale Bridge and another which followed the perimeter of Alameda's South Shore.
