= South Shore, Alameda, California =

Coordinates: 37°45′35″N 122°15′28″W

South Shore is a neighborhood in Alameda in Alameda County, California. It lies at an elevation of 13 feet (4 m). It is located mostly on landfill extending from the (old sea wall) original south shore of the island, now a chain of artificial lagoons. The land was created by the Utah Construction Company during the 1950s and 1960s, and the neighborhood was built in a more suburban style than the rest of the island, with a mix of Tract housing and large apartment complexes, and strict Single-use zoning. It is the location of the South Shore Center shopping complex, Alameda's only large shopping mall. The two mile long Crown Memorial State Beach lies along the neighborhood's southern shore.

== See also ==
- Bay Farm Island
- Save the Bay
- Utah Construction Company
