= Park Street Bridge =

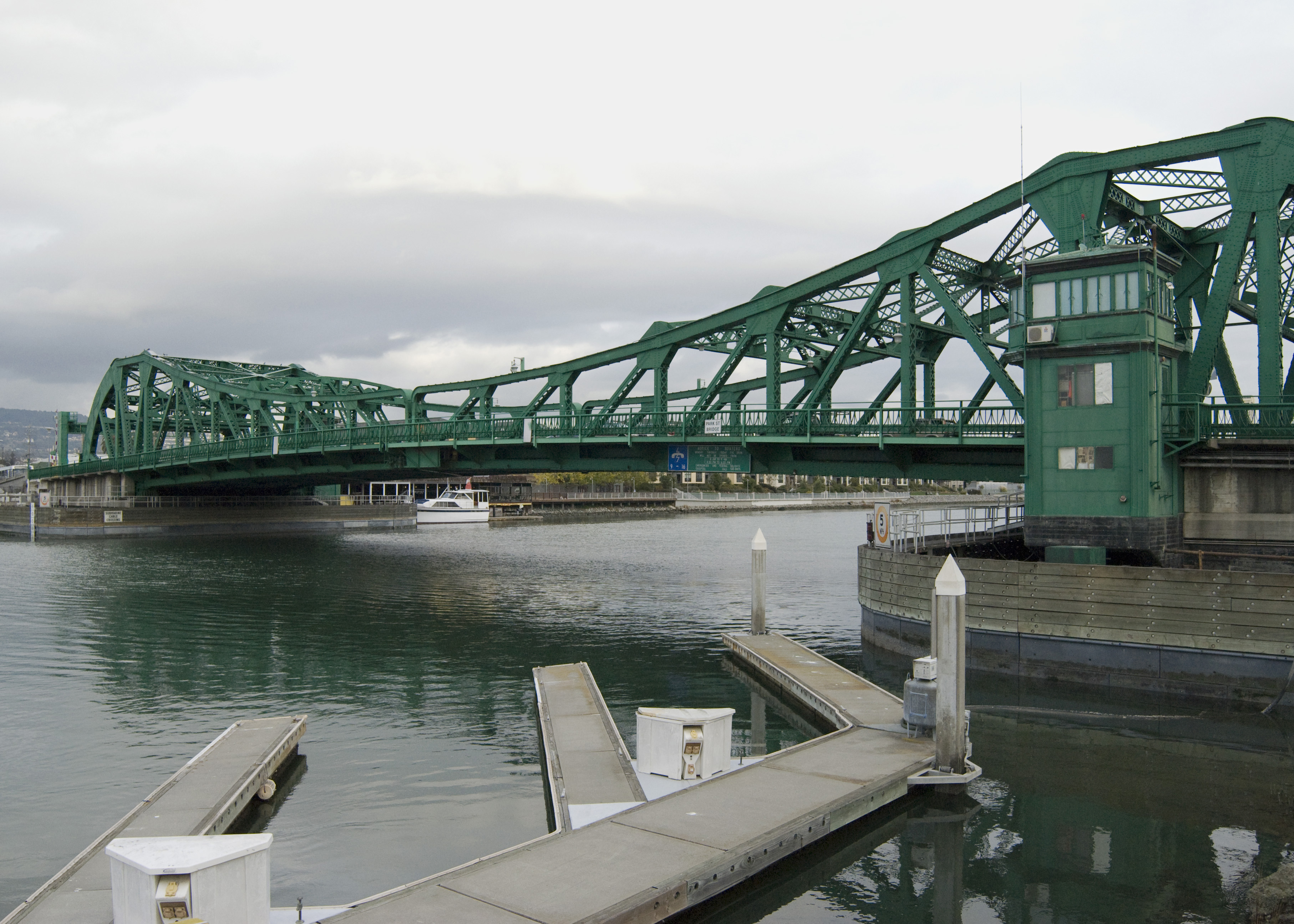
- Park Street Bridge
- Coordinates: 37°46′18.08″N 122°14′11.65″W
- Crosses: Oakland Estuary
- Locale: San Francisco Bay Area

Characteristics
- Total length: 372 feet

History
- Opened: 1893
- Rebuilt: 1935

Location
- Interactive map of Park Street Bridge

The Park Street Bridge is a double-leaf bascule drawbridge spanning 372 feet of the Oakland Estuary in the San Francisco Bay Area. It links the cities of Oakland and Alameda. In a year, the bridge is opened approximately 1700 times and carries approximately 40,000 vehicles per work day. It was built when the Oakland Estuary was trenched, converting Alameda from a peninsula to an island.

The Park Street bridge is one of the four bridges that allow access to Alameda. It is considered the best route for bicycles to cross to Alameda as the small narrow walkway in the Posey Tube is difficult to navigate if there is another pedestrian or bicyclist also using it.

According to the Historic Bridges.org, The design of this fixed trunnion bascule bridge is strikingly similar to the earliest fixed trunnion bascule bridges built in Chicago in the first decade of the 20th Century including external rack (visible at the ends of the trusses) and through truss design (with no overhead bracing at the center of the bridge), however this California example dates to 1935.

== History ==
The original Park Street bridge was completed in 1893. The Park Street, High Street, and Fruitvale Avenue bridges were built by the U.S. Government in exchange for permission and rights-of-way to dredge the channel between San Antonio Creek and San Leandro Bay. It had a wooden deck, a wrought iron thru truss swing span and wooden trestle approach spans. Riding the bridge as it opened to let water traffic through, as well as fishing off the bridge, were popular activities. It took ten years after the bridge's completion to dredge the channel.

The present bridge was designed by the County of Alameda Surveyors Office and constructed under the Federal WPA Program. It was opened in 1935 with a grand opening celebration that included a public wedding of a man from Oakland and woman from Alameda to symbolize the unity of the two cities with the building of the bridge.

The bridge was used in a scene from the 1995 Sandra Bullock film The Net.
