= Alameda Museum =

- Location within California
- Former name: Alameda Historical Museum
- Location: 2324 Alameda Avenue, Alameda, California, United States
- Coordinates: 37.76355°N 122.244136°W
- Type: History museum
- Owner: Alameda Historical Society
- Website: www.alamedamuseum.org

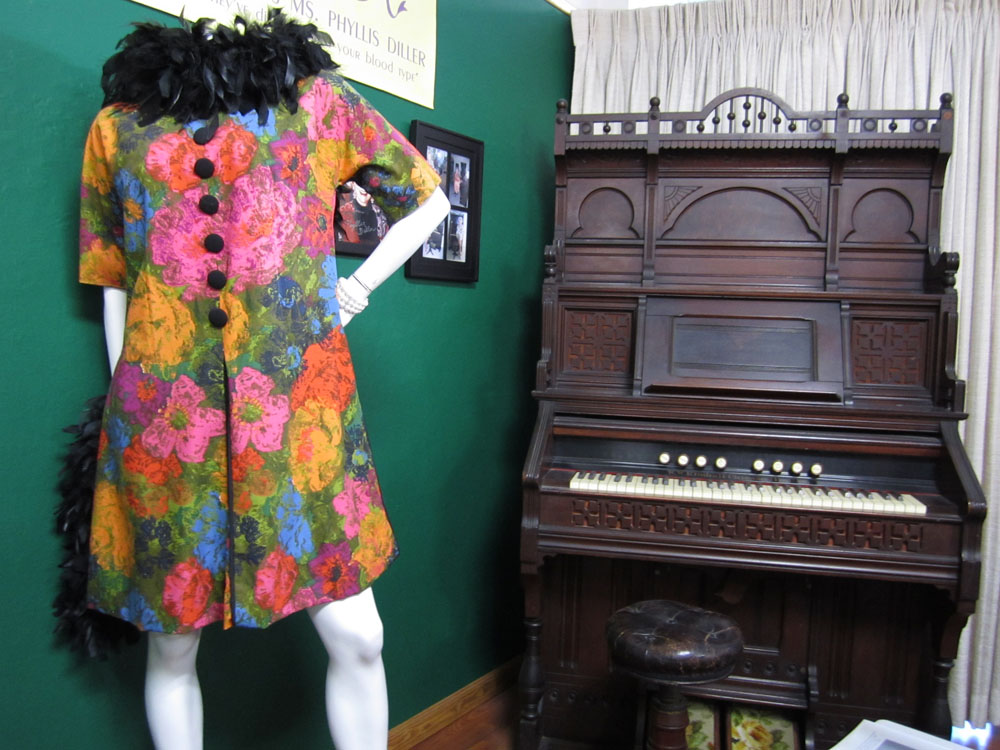
Part of the Phyllis Diller collection on display during the "For the Love of Phyllis Diller" show on November 7, 2015, Alameda, California.

The Alameda Museum is a history museum about the history and culture of Alameda, California. It is located in Alameda, California, in the United States. The museum includes exhibitions about old dioramas, model ships and toys, Native American culture, the Alameda fire department, Neptune Beach and Phyllis Diller. The museum also features rotating exhibitions and partners frequently with children to create exhibits.

== History ==
The museum opened in 1951 in the basement the Carnegie Library. In 1971, after thirty years of not paying rent, the museum moved to Alameda High School so the Alameda Historical Society library could have more space. There, they paid $150 a month to assist with utilities. The museum lost its lease in 1981 and moved to its current location on Alameda Avenue.

The museum is currently funded by the county government. In 2014, the museum hosted Diller Day, which celebrated the life and work of Phyllis Diller. The museum has a permanent exhibition about the comedian.
