= South Shore station (disambiguation) =

South Shore station is a commuter railroad station in Chicago. Other uses:

- South Shore railway station, a disused railway station in Blackpool, United Kingdom
- South Portsmouth–South Shore station in South Shore, Kentucky
- Any station on the South Shore Line
