= South Shore High School =

South Shore High School may refer to:

- South Shore High School (Brooklyn)
- South Shore High School (Chicago)
