= California State Route 61 =

State highway in California

State Route 61
- SR 61 highlighted in red; the gap represents the relinquished portion

Route information
- Maintained by Caltrans
- Length: 10.30 mi (16.58 km) Length of SR 112 is 1.78 mi (3 km); Length of SR 260 is 1.35 mi (2 km) (portions of SR 260 have been relinquished to or are otherwise maintained by local or other governments, and are not included in the length.)
- Existed: 1964–present
- Restrictions: No hazardous materials in the Posey and Webster Street tubes

Major junctions
- South end: SR 185 in San Leandro
- I-880 in San Leandro
- North end: I-880 in Oakland

Location
- Country: United States
- State: California
- Counties: Alameda

Highway system
- State highways in California; Interstate; US; State; Scenic; History; Pre‑1964; Unconstructed; Deleted; Freeways
← SR 60	→ SR 62
← SR 111	→ SR 113
← SR 259	→ SR 261

State Route 61 (SR 61) is a state highway in the U.S. state of California, running along the eastern edge of Oakland International Airport and through Alameda. Two additional "hidden" state highways, State Route 112 (SR 112) and State Route 260 (SR 260), are also signed as part of SR 61, despite having legal descriptions separate from Route 61.

SR 112 runs along Davis Street from State Route 185 (East 14th Street) west to Doolittle Drive in San Leandro. SR 61 proper then follows Doolittle Drive north near the eastern boundary of Oakland International Airport to Bay Farm Island and across the Bay Farm Island Bridge to Alameda Island. SR 61 then runs on various city streets in Alameda to Webster Street. SR 260 then goes from Webster Street through the Posey and Webster Street tubes to near Interstate 880 in Oakland. Though some maps mark the highway as continuous along Alameda's Webster Street, control of the segment between Central Avenue and Atlantic Avenue was relinquished to the city and is thus no longer officially part of the state highway system. As of 2012, a sign indicating SR 61 East near the I-880 interchange was replaced with an SR 112 shield; it has been replaced with a SR 61 sign as of 2025.

As legislatively defined, Route 61 extends as far north as Albany and as far south as the Dumbarton Bridge's east approach. Only the portion between Routes 260 and 112 is constructed; the unbuilt remainder of the route exists today either as open San Francisco Bay or wetlands. This route would likely have sat atop landfill; as public opinion shifted against filling in the bay, completing the remaining portions of Route 61 also fell out of favor. Route 87 is another highway once proposed to traverse present-day wetlands and open water.

== Route description ==
The combined SR 112/61/260 route begins at SR 185 in San Leandro. Running along Davis Street, it then interchanges with Interstate 880 before it heads to Doolittle Drive. It then continues northward along Doolittle Drive and enters the city of Oakland, running along the eastern boundary of Oakland International Airport. The highway then enters the city of Alameda at Bay Farm Island before crossing the San Leandro Bay via a drawbridge to Alameda Island. SR 61 then goes west along Otis Drive, then north along Broadway until reaching Encinal Avenue. The route then heads west on Encinal Avenue and Central Avenue to Webster Street. The highway then runs across Webster Street and through the Posey and Webster Street tubes before terminating at I-880 and 7th Street in Oakland. The route does not directly intersect with I-880 here, so drivers are instructed to get onto I-880 south via Oak Street or I-880 north via Jackson Street. There are two tube entrances on the Oakland side, one on Webster Street, and the other at the intersection of Broadway and 5th Street; the latter can be reached from I-880's Broadway off-ramps.

California's legislature has relinquished state control of the segment along Webster Street between Central Avenue and Atlantic Avenue, and thus that portion is now maintained by the City of Alameda.

SR 61 is part of the California Freeway and Expressway System, and all three routes are part of the National Highway System, a network of highways that are considered essential to the country's economy, defense, and mobility by the Federal Highway Administration.

== Major intersections ==
Except where prefixed with a letter, postmiles were measured on the road as it was in 1964, based on the alignment that existed at the time, and do not necessarily reflect current mileage. Postmile prefixes include: R reflecting a realignment in the route since then, M indicating a second realignment, L referring to an overlap due to a correction or change, and T indicating postmiles classified as temporary. Segments that remain unconstructed or have been relinquished to local control may be omitted. The entire route is in Alameda County.

Location	Postmile	Destinations	Notes
San Leandro	1.78 (Note: Indicates that the postmile represents the distance along SR 112 rather than SR 61.)	Callan Avenue	Continuation beyond SR 185
San Leandro	1.78	SR 185 (East 14th Street)	South end of SR 61; east end of unsigned SR 112
San Leandro	0.60	I-880 (Nimitz Freeway) – Oakland, San Jose	Interchange; I-880 exit 34; former SR 17
San Leandro	R0.00 14.80	Davis Street, Doolittle Drive	West end of unsigned SR 112
Oakland	16.07	98th Avenue to I-880 – Oakland International Airport	Interchange
Alameda	18.55	Bay Farm Island Bridge over San Leandro Bay	
Alameda	21.97 0.00 (Note: Indicates that the postmile represents the distance along SR 260 rather than SR 61.)	Central Avenue, Webster Street	North end of state maintenance
Alameda	R0.57	Atlantic Avenue, Ralph Appezzato Memorial Parkway	South end of unsigned SR 260 and state maintenance
Alameda	R0.86	Wilver "Willie" Stargell Avenue	At-grade intersection; former southbound exit and entrance interchange; formerly Mariner Square Drive
Alameda	R0.86	Wilma Chan Way, Marina Village Parkway	Interchange; southbound left exit and northbound entrance; formerly Constitution Way
Alameda–Oakland line	R1.12 R1.20	Posey and Webster Street Tubes under Oakland Estuary	
Oakland	R1.75	Broadway, 5th Street	Southbound entrance only
Oakland	R1.92	7th Street to I-880 (Nimitz Freeway) / I-980 east – San Francisco, San Jose, Jack London Square	North end of SR 61 and unsigned SR 260
Oakland	R1.92	Harrison Street	Continuation beyond 7th Street; southbound entrance accessible from Webster Street
1.000 mi = 1.609 km; 1.000 km = 0.621 mi: Incomplete access
