= Bay Farm Island Bridge =

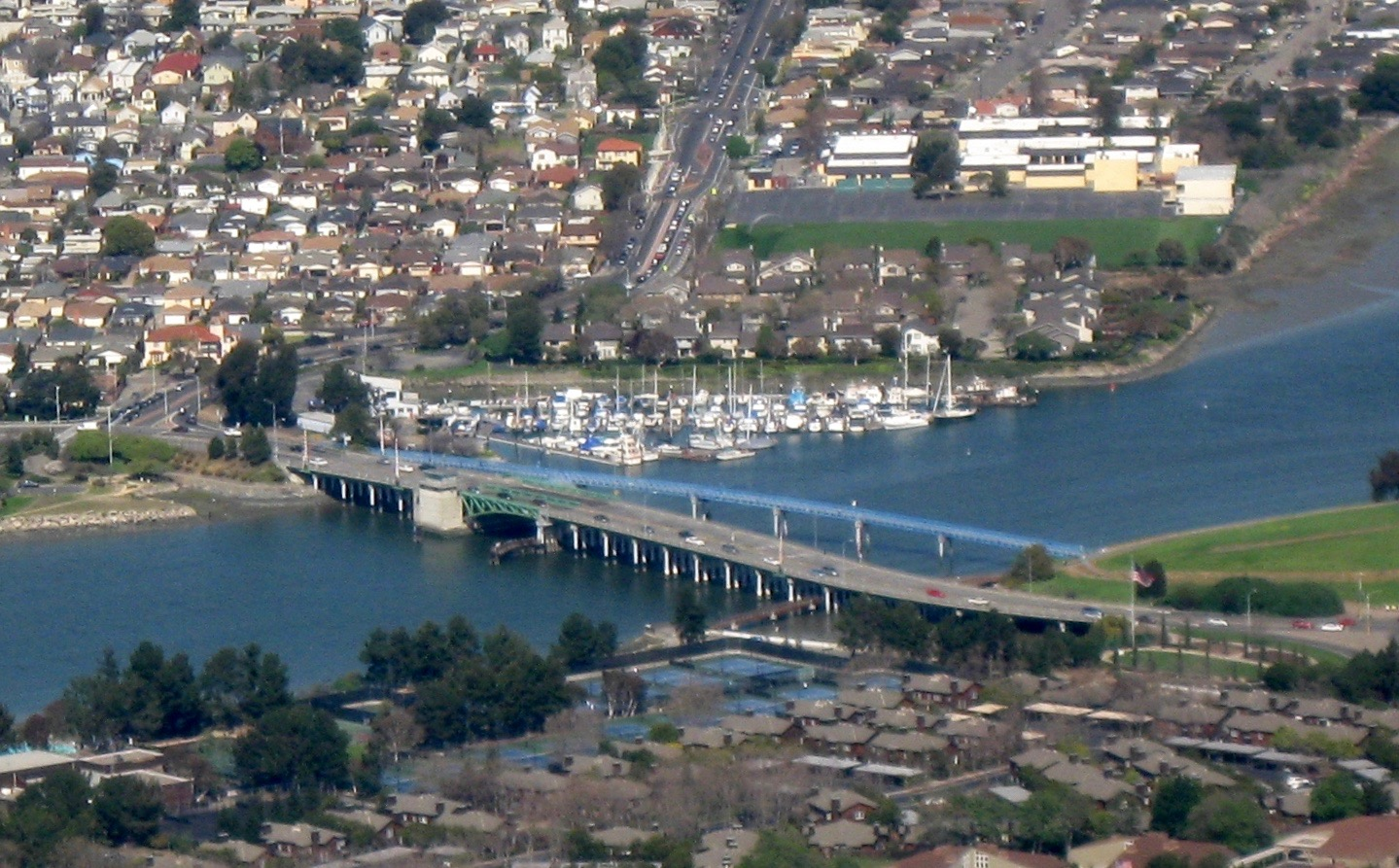
- Aerial view of both bridges (2009)
- Coordinates: 37.748924°N 122.236383°W
- Carries: cars and trucks on SR 61
- Crosses: San Leandro Channel, leading to San Leandro Bay
- Locale: San Francisco Bay Area
- Official name: San Leandro Bay Bridge
- NBI: 33 0086

Characteristics
- Design: Bascule truss
- Material: Steel, concrete
- Total length: 963 ft 6 in (293.67 m)
- Width: 70 ft 6 in (21.49 m) overall 26 ft (7.9 m) roadway 5 ft (1.5 m) sidewalk
- Longest span: 125 ft (38 m) bascule
- Clearance below: 20 ft (6.1 m) (high tide); 26 ft (7.9 m) (low tide)

History
- Constructed by: Duncason-Harleson and Stolte
- Construction start: April 18, 1951
- Opened: July 1, 1953

Statistics
- Daily traffic: 40,000

Location
- Interactive map of Bay Farm Island Bridge

Bay Farm Island Bicycle Bridge
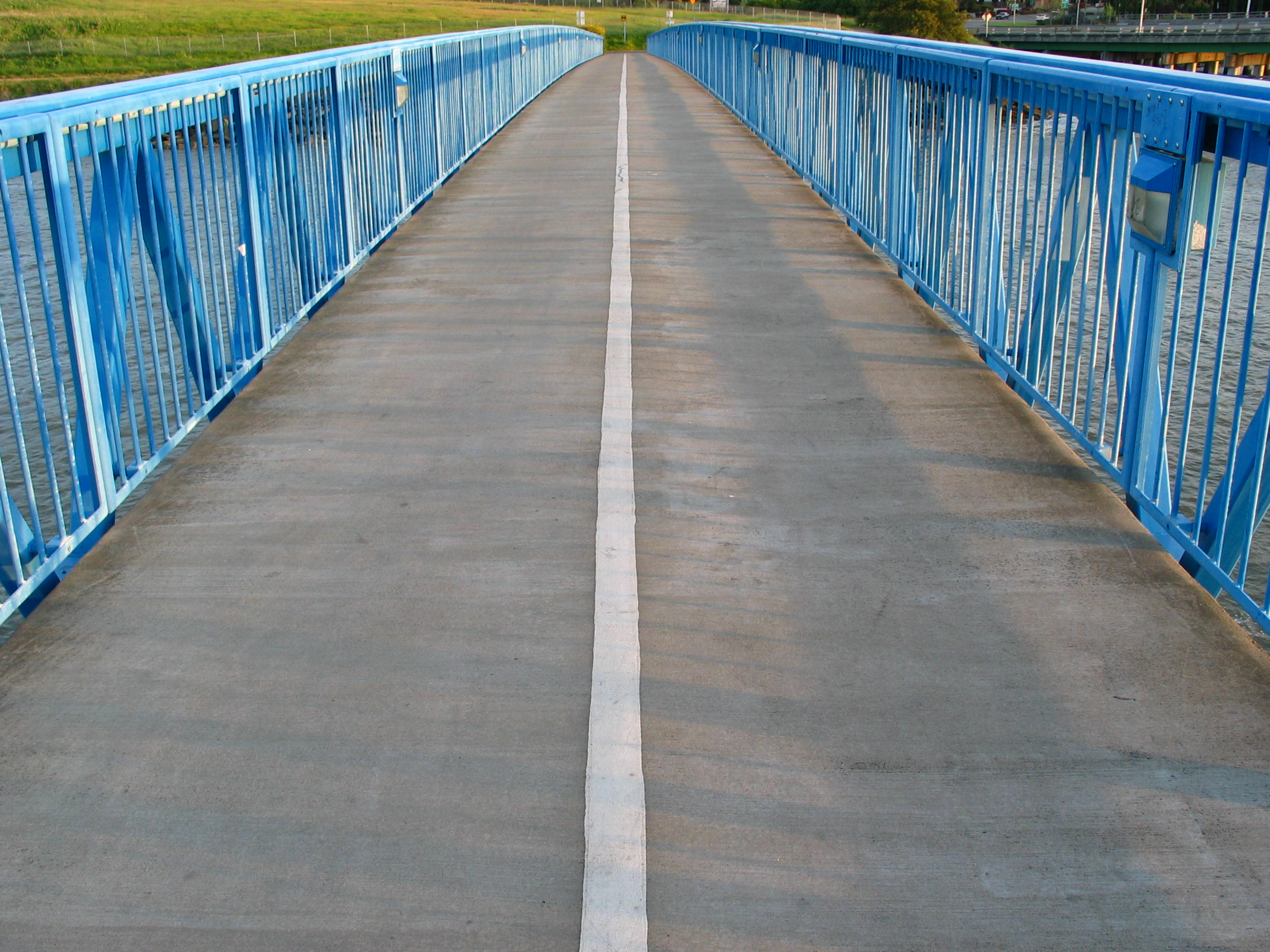
- View along bicycle bridge
- Coordinates: 37°44′56.5″N 122°14′9.3″W
- Carries: bicycles and pedestrians on San Francisco Bay Trail
- Official name: San Leandro Bay Bike Bridge

Characteristics
- Design: Bascule, pony Warren truss
- Material: Steel, concrete
- Total length: 750 ft (230 m)
- Width: 14 ft (4.3 m) overall 11 ft (3.4 m) curb-to-curb
- Longest span: 130 feet (40 m) bascule
- Clearance below: 20 ft (6.1 m) (high tide); 26 ft (7.9 m) (low tide)

History
- Construction start: 1993
- Opened: 1995

Location
- Interactive map of Bay Farm Island Bicycle Bridge

The San Leandro Bay Bridge, better known as the Bay Farm Island Bridge, is a single-leaf bascule drawbridge spanning the San Leandro Channel, the inlet of San Leandro Bay within the San Francisco Bay Area, California, United States. It carries California State Route 61 and links the main island of Alameda with Bay Farm Island within the city of Alameda. The present bridge was completed in 1953; it is paralleled by a second bridge (completed in 1995) devoted to pedestrian and bicycle traffic, the Bay Farm Island Bicycle Bridge.

The Bay Farm Island Bridge is one of the four bridges and two tunnels linking Alameda Island with the mainland. It is the longest bridge of the four.

== History ==
A toll bridge at this location was first built in 1854, consisting of a wooden trestle surfaced with crushed oyster shells. The owners abandoned the bridge after a failed business deal for land on Bay Farm Island, and the 1854 bridge subsequently rotted. Alameda County constructed a second bridge in 1875. In 1877 the bridge was described as a drawbridge with an overall length of 700 feet (210 m). The second bridge had been repaired in 1890, and was replaced by a third bridge in 1898. Parts of the third bridge had initially been built in 1881 to span the Oakland Estuary at Webster Street, and were moved to span the San Leandro Channel in 1898; the third bridge was a swing-type bridge. By 1904, it was described as a "creaking old bridge", and by 1912, the bridge had "settled dangerously" and "needed immediate repairs."

In 1899, Mr. Gighilone, a vegetable farmer from Bay Farm Island, was ambushed by customs officers while crossing the bridge. The customs officers believed he was in league with opium smugglers who supposedly had their headquarters on Bay Farm Island; the smugglers purportedly used vegetable peddlers to smuggle opium across the bridge to Alameda, where it would be taken to San Francisco for distribution. When Gighilone was commanded to stop, he thought he was being robbed and attempted to escape until several bullets convinced him to stop.

The fourth bridge, completed in 1953 and opened for service on July 1 of that year, was constructed by the California Department of Transportation (CalTrans) as part of California State Route 61. It is owned and maintained by CalTrans, District 4. The total cost of the 1953 bridge, including right-of-way acquisition, approach structures, engineering, design, and construction, was US$2,344,000 (equivalent to $28,210,000 in 2025).

The bicycle bridge was constructed between 1993 and 1995 at a cost of approximately US$3,500,000 (equivalent to $7,400,000 in 2025).

In late 2015 and early 2016, the road and bicycle bridges were temporarily closed at night to accommodate maintenance activities, including repainting the road bridge. It had last been painted in 1978.

== Design ==
The 1953 road bridge is the longest bascule bridge in Alameda County by overall length. It was designed to accommodate a future second leaf, if warranted by marine traffic, to double the navigable channel width from 92 feet (28 m) to 200 feet (61 m). The existing leaf is opened by two 50-horsepower (37 kW) motors in approximately 135 seconds. The bridge was designed by the California Division of Highways, Bridge Department.

The main pier of the 1953 road bridge is the largest cofferdam built on a state highway since the construction of the San Francisco–Oakland Bay Bridge. The bascule span is 125 feet (38 m) long and carries a counterweight of 1,100 short tons (1,000 t). Interlocks are provided so that traffic gates and bollards must be raised before the draw can be opened.

The 1995 bicycle bridge is linked to the 1953 road bridge so that when the road bridge opens, the bicycle bridge also opens; however, the bicycle bridge can be operated manually to open independently of the road bridge. The bicycle bridge is operated using two hydraulic pistons and two 50-horsepower (37 kW) motors; the other drawbridges linking Alameda to the mainland operate using gearboxes and gears. It is the only pedestrian bascule bridge in the United States.
