= Arroyo Viejo =

Arroyo Viejo Old Creek
- Location of the mouth of Arroyo Viejo in California

Location
- Country: United States
- State: California
- Region: Alameda County
- City: Oakland

Physical characteristics
- Source
  - coordinates: 37°45′38″N 122°07′48″W
  - elevation: 450 ft (140 m)
- Mouth: San Leandro Bay
  - coordinates: 37°45′17″N 122°12′05″W
  - elevation: 1 ft (0.30 m)

Basin features
- Tributaries
  - right: Arroyo Melrose Highlands Branch, 73rd Avenue Branch

Arroyo Viejo (“Old Creek” in Spanish) is a westward flowing 5.1 miles (8.2 km) creek that begins in the Oakland Hills in Alameda County, California, and joins Lion Creek just before entering San Leandro Bay, a part of eastern San Francisco Bay.

== Watershed and course ==
The Arroyo Viejo Creek Watershed drains 6.2 square miles (16 km^{2}) beginning on the western slope of the Oakland hills and running west through the northern boundary of Knowland Park then urban Oakland before merging with Lion Creek and entering San Leandro Bay, and finally, San Francisco Bay. Rifle Range Creek begins in the Leona Canyon Regional Open Space park, then joins the Arroyo Melrose Highlands Branch, which is also joined by Country Club Creek (which flows along the northern boundary of Sequoyah Country Club). The Arroyo Melrose Highlands Branch joins Arroyo Viejo at the MacArthur Freeway. Below the freeway, the creek is joined by the 73rd Avenue Branch (which is in an underground pipe), and continues in a series of engineered channels and underground culverts to Lion Creek (also known as Arroyo de Leona) and crosses Interstate 880 to San Leandro Bay within the larger San Francisco Bay.

== Ecology ==
The upper tributaries of Arroyo Viejo lie in what was historically a belt of coast redwood (Sequoia sempervirens) extending from the Leona Canyon Regional Open Space Preserve up to Redwood Regional Park and east to Moraga.

== See also ==
- Rivers of California
