= Damon Marsh =

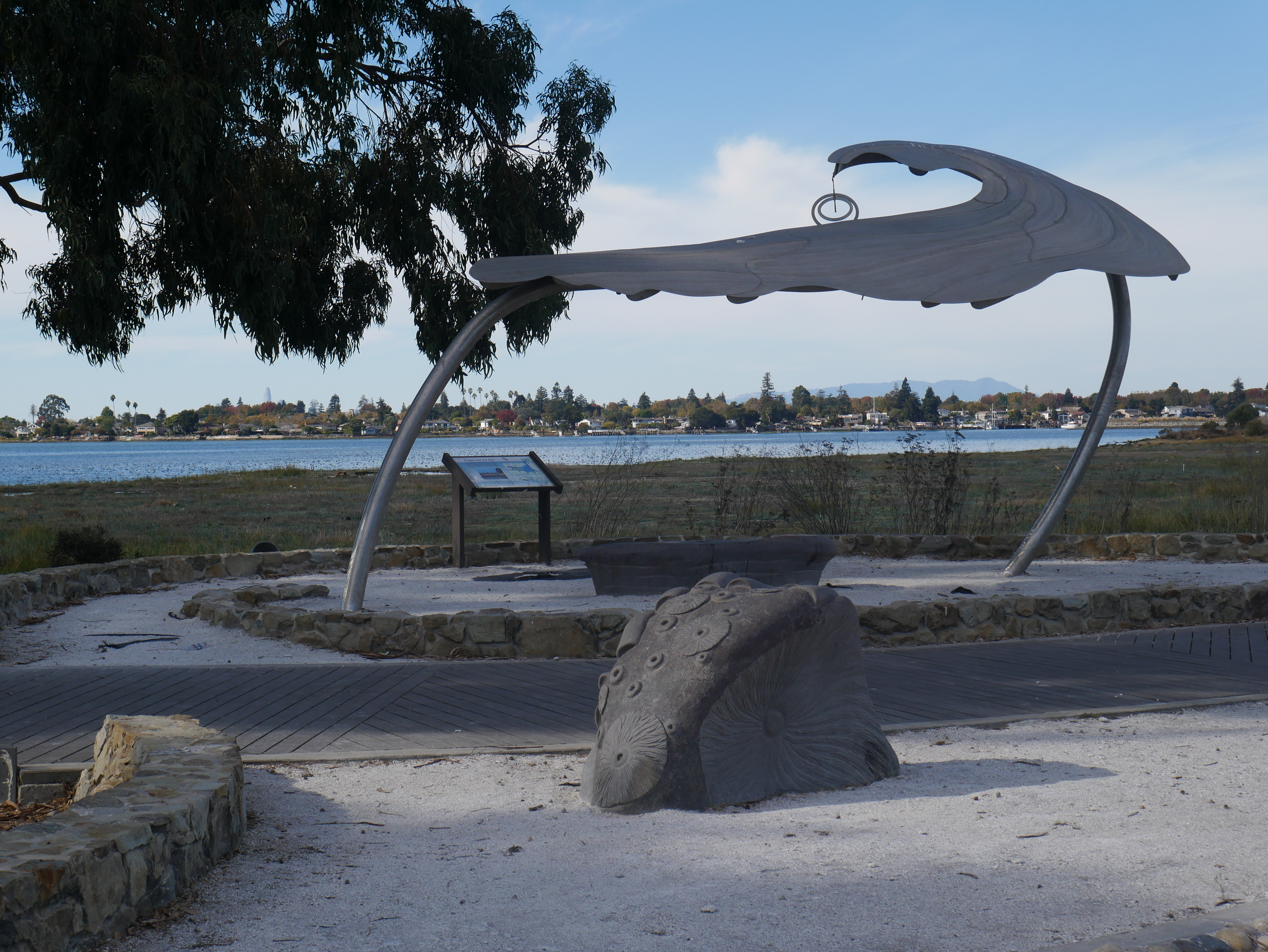
Damon Marsh protected area near Damon Slough

The Damon Marsh is a tidal wetland at the northern edge of San Leandro Bay in Oakland, California, US. There is a paved 0.84-mile (1.35 km) long shoreline trail along the waterfront to allow visual access to the San Leandro Bay and through the marsh itself. One end of this trailhead lies at Damon Slough. Access to the marsh is via the Hegenberger Road exit of Interstate 880. A 1989 biological study of the Damon Marsh found that this habitat supports the California clapper rail (Rallus longirostros obsoletus), a federally and state-listed endangered avian species.

== See also ==
- California least tern
- Kayaking
- Salt marsh harvest mouse

37.75304°N 122.21136°W
