= Posey and Webster Street Tubes =

Underwater tunnels in California

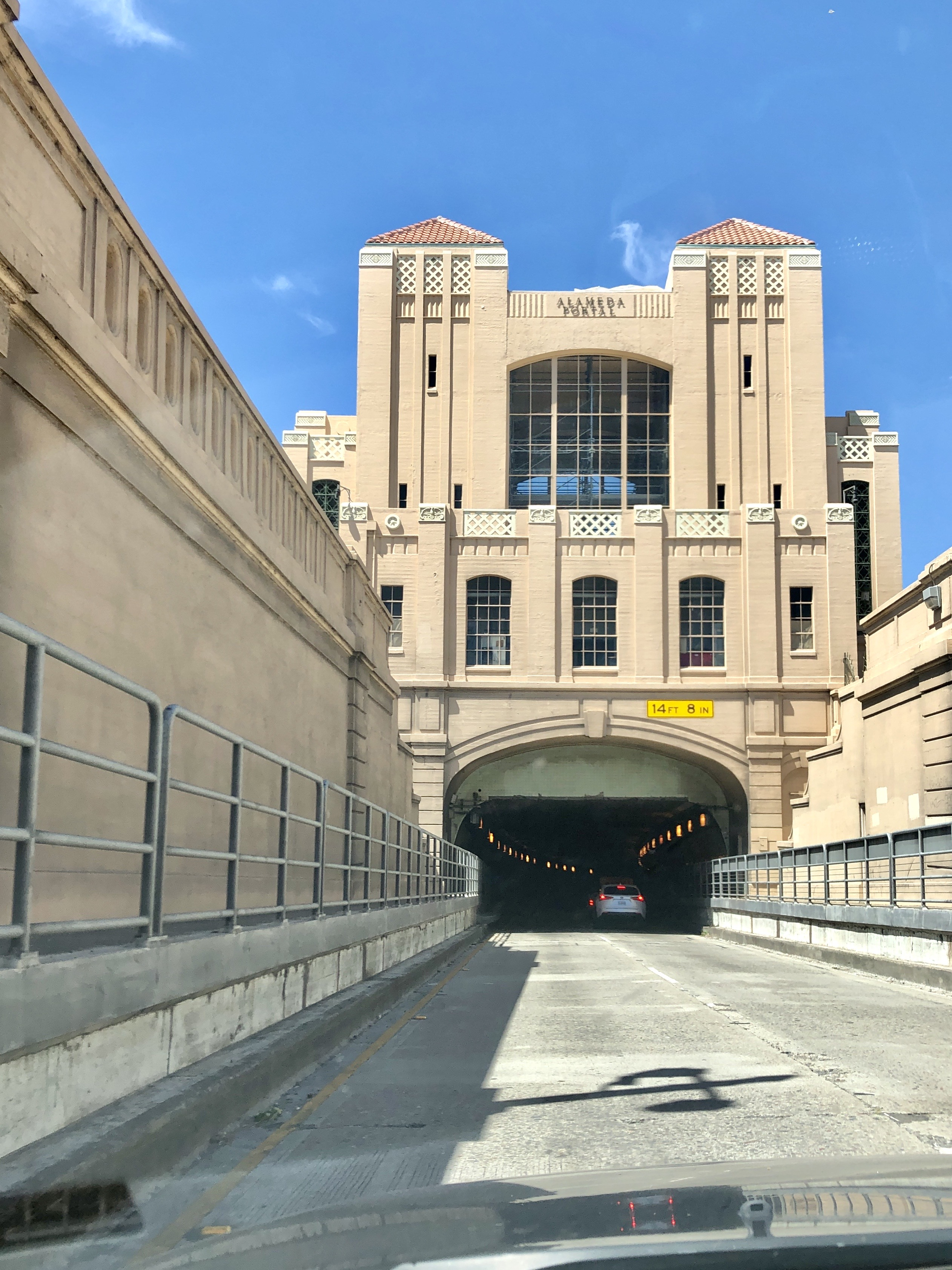
- Posey Tube

Overview
- Location: Alameda, California and Oakland, California
- Coordinates: 37°47′16″N 122°16′38″W
- Route: SR 260 (Signed as SR 61)
- Crosses: Oakland Estuary
- Start: North of Wilma Chan Way in Alameda
- End: South of 6th Street in Oakland

Operation
- Work began: June 15, 1925 (Posey); October 12, 1959 (Webster)
- Opened: October 27, 1928 (Posey); February 13, 1963 (Webster)
- Operator: California Department of Transportation

Technical
- Length: 3,545.1 feet (1,080.5 m)
- No. of lanes: 2 per tube
- Tunnel clearance: 14.67 feet (4.47 m) (Posey Tube); 14.83 feet (4.52 m) (Webster St. Tube)

The Posey and Webster Street Tubes are two parallel underwater tunnels connecting the cities of Oakland and Alameda, California, running beneath the Oakland Estuary. Both are immersed tubes, constructed by sinking precast concrete segments to a trench in the Estuary floor, then sealing them together to create a tunnel. The Posey Tube, completed in 1928, currently carries one-way (Oakland-bound) traffic under the Estuary, while the Webster Street Tube, completed in 1963, carries traffic from Oakland to Alameda.

The Posey Tube is the second-oldest underwater vehicular tunnel in the US, preceded only by the Holland Tunnel. It is the oldest immersed tube vehicular tunnel in the world.

== History ==
The Oakland Estuary (then known as San Antonio Creek) was first crossed by the Webster Street swing bridge for narrow gauge rail and road traffic, completed in 1871. A second crossing was added in 1873 as the Alice Street swing bridge, built for Central Pacific (later Southern Pacific) rail traffic.

Both the Webster and Alice bridges were replaced by new swing bridges completed in 1900 and 1898, respectively. The Alice bridge was replaced by the Harrison Street bridge, one block west. The replacements were prompted by the Secretary of War, who stated the swing spans each needed to be at least 150 feet (46 m) to accommodate marine traffic in 1896. At first, it was planned to replace both bridges with a single bridge, but Southern Pacific officials were unable to come to an agreement with Alameda County supervisors, and in 1897 the railroad declared the Harrison Street bridge, replacing the Alice bridge, would be devoted solely to rail traffic, accommodating both narrow and standard-gauge trains. During the construction of the replacement Webster bridge, county supervisors initially rejected an offer to use the old Alice bridge as a detour for road traffic, but later accepted, avoiding a more distant route through the eastern part of Alameda, and teamster traffic moved to Alice in December. The old Webster bridge was demolished by January 1899.

By 1916, the War Department had declared the replacement Webster and Harrison bridges were a menace to deep-water navigation and an obstacle to continued development of Oakland Harbor in 1916. As an example, SS Lancaster rammed the Webster Street bridge in January 1926, causing the swing section to fall into the Estuary and forcing road traffic to be rerouted. The Harrison Street bridge closed to traffic after December 26, 1923 and was largely demolished the following day. After the completion of the Posey Tube, the Webster Street bridge was sold to Sacramento County for US$3,100 (equivalent to $60,000 in 2025) in November 1928. The central swing span was subsequently floated by barge up the Delta and reassembled as part of the new American River Bridge, later known as the Jibboom Street Bridge.

=== Posey Tube ===
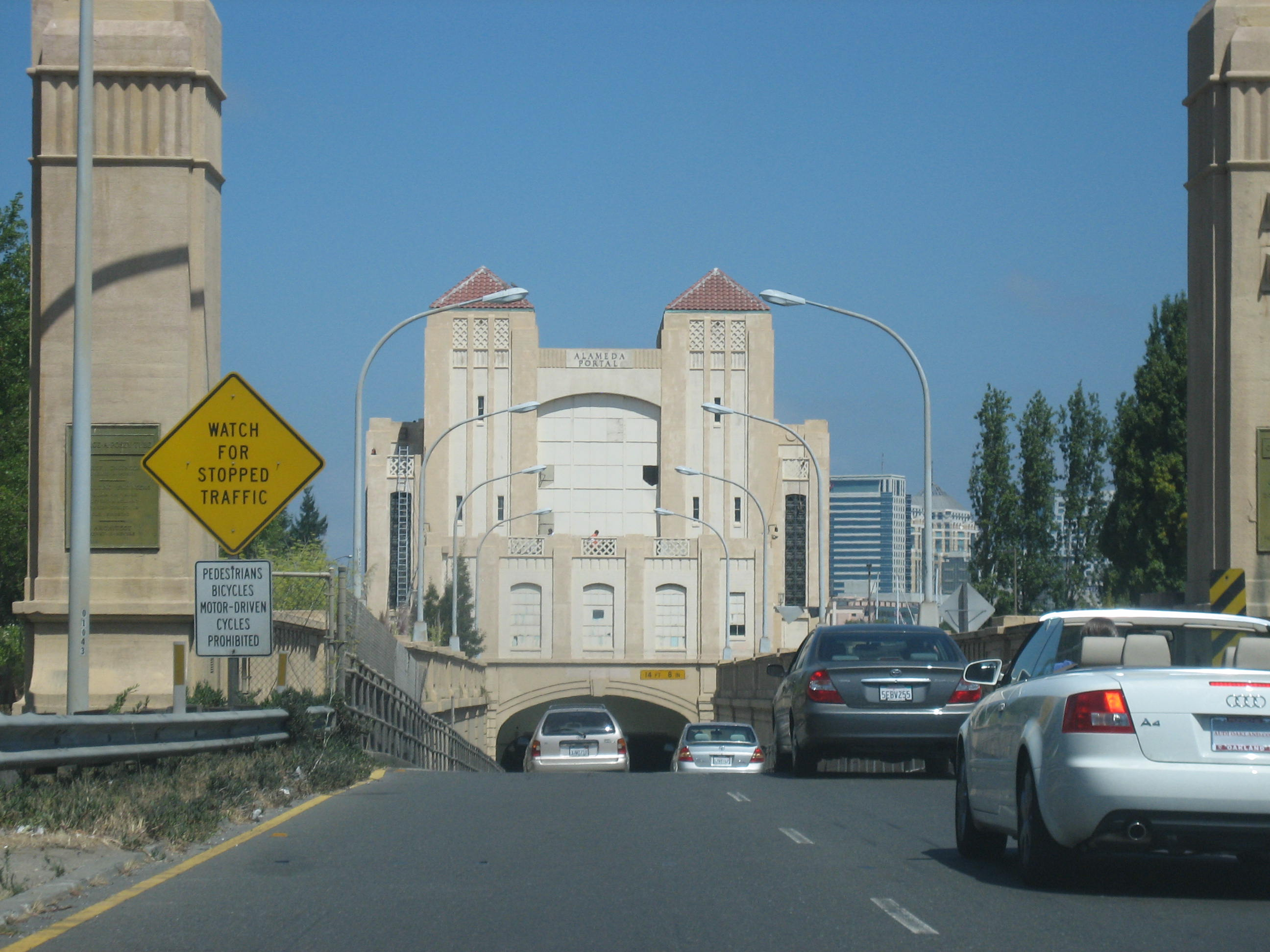
Posey Tube entrance in Alameda

Preliminary plans for a tube had been explored as early as 1903, but detailed studies were not prepared until 1922. However, the entry of the United States into World War I delayed the plans for a new connection between Oakland and Alameda. A permit for the tube under the Oakland Estuary was granted in April 1923 and Alameda County voters approved a $5 million bond measure in May to build the tube.

After the passage of the bond issue, test borings were taken in the Estuary, and bids were received for the work on March 23, 1925; the construction contract was awarded to the California Bridge and Tunnel Company (CB&TC) with a low bid of US$3,882,958 (equivalent to $71,290,000 in 2025), and excavation started from the Oakland end on June 15, 1925. The contract was let by Alameda County without state involvement.

The Posey Tube, completed and opened to traffic on October 27, 1928, was named after George Posey, who was the Alameda County Surveyor during the tunnel's planning and construction, and also chief engineer on the construction project. It is the first tunnel for road traffic built using the immersed tube technique. However, the two-lane tube was considered inadequate shortly after its completion. In 1952, the Posey Tube was handling 30,000 to 36,000 cars per day; that same year, Coronado, California, and its mayor Lloyd Harmon contemplated the laying of a similar tunnel to connect Coronado with San Diego, when Alameda mayor Frank Osborne wrote a letter to Harmon, which stated

from the time it was completed the tube was never adequate for the purpose for which it was built ... I am firmly of the belief that the building of any underwater tube of less than four lanes—two in each direction—would be a serious mistake on the part of any engineers who contemplate it.

=== Design ===
The ventilation buildings that house the exhaust and fresh air fans are built in an art deco style; local architect Henry H. Meyers is credited with the design of both portals. The design of the ventilation system to handle toxic vehicular exhaust fumes was modeled on that of the Holland Tunnel's ventilation system, and Ole Singstad (who had designed the pioneering ventilation system of the Holland Tunnel) consulted. A pair of canaries were used during construction as living air monitors; although one canary died during construction, it was an accident caused by being penned up with a pet cat and not a toxic atmosphere. Up to that time, tunnels had been vented longitudinally, with fresh air blown in one end and out the other; the Holland (and Posey) Tube instead used fans to supply air into the tunnel through a space beneath the roadway, and exhausted air through a similar space above the traffic portion. Ducts were set in the curb and ceiling approximately every 15 feet (4.6 m) along the length of the Posey Tube, providing a system of "transverse" ventilation, bottom-to-top rather than end-to-end, ensuring that any fires would not spread through the length of the tunnel.

Typical section of Webster Street Tube; Posey Tube sections are similar.

It was the first precast concrete tube to be constructed, assembled from 12 large segments. The concrete tube was protected from leaks through insulation and coverings applied to the outer surface. Each segment was cast at Hunters Point by CB&TC. After they were completed, the segments were sealed and the space beneath the roadway was filled with water as ballast while floating each segment into position; when ready, wet sand was added to the roadway to sink the segment into a dredged underwater trench. Once the joint to the prior segment had been sealed, the water ballast was pumped out and the process was repeated for the next segment.

Including the approaches at each end, the Posey Tube is 4,436 feet (1,352 m) long; the tunnel portion itself is 3,545 feet (1,081 m) long. Each segment is 203 feet (62 m) long and 37 feet (11 m) in diameter, and weighs approximately 5,000 short tons (4,500 t). The walls of the tube are 2 1/2 feet (0.76 m) thick. From Oakland, the approach extends from Sixth Street to Third Street along Harrison Street. The maximum grade within the Posey Tube is 4.59%.

=== Webster Street Tube ===
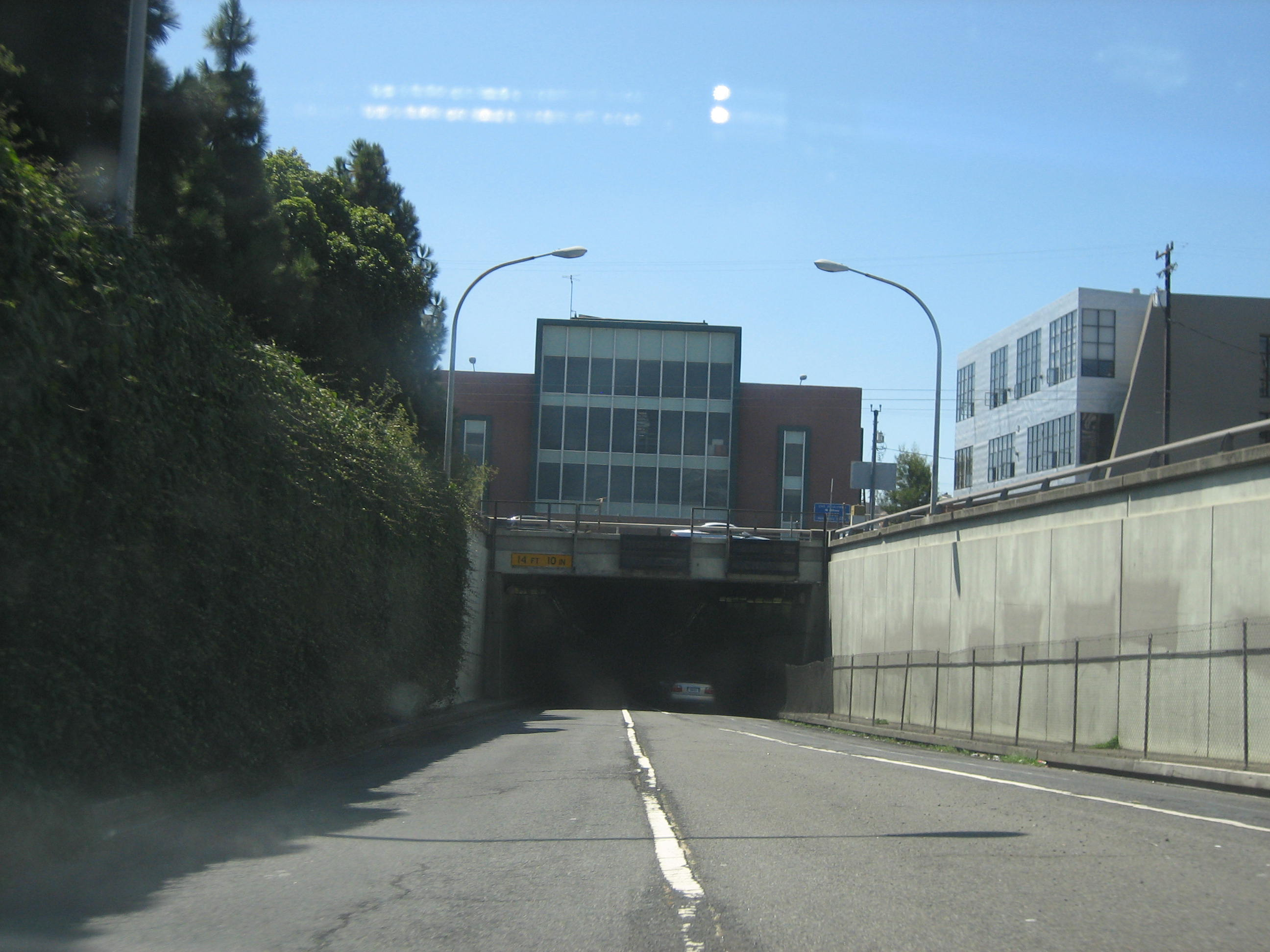
Webster Street Tube entrance in Oakland

The Webster Street Tube was constructed west of and parallel to the Posey Tube to accommodate increased traffic between Oakland and Alameda and to address the deficiencies of the original design, a single tube with only two lanes. In 1941, "final negotiations" were being made for a second tube, and plans for a second tube at Webster Street had been advanced in 1948 as part of a Parallel Bridge scheme. The Parallel Bridge was one of the "Southern Crossing" designs which would have added another trans-Bay bridge south of the 1936 San Francisco–Oakland Bay Bridge.

Construction began on October 12, 1959. To prepare the Alameda site, a large Navy hangar was moved; at the time, it set a record for the largest building ever moved. The Webster Street Tube was completed and opened to one-way (into Alameda) traffic in 1963. Upon completion of the Webster Street Tube, the Posey Tube was closed temporarily and renovations were performed to convert it to one-way (into Oakland) traffic; during renovations, the Webster Street Tube handled bidirectional traffic.

Like the preceding Posey Tube, the Webster Street Tube was constructed using immersed precast concrete segments; this time the twelve Webster segments were constructed in a graving dock built on Alameda. Divers were used to ensure each segment landed in the surveyed location. Piles were driven to support each segment, but the piles were designed to collapse after an additional 600 short tons (540 t) of ballast were added, to ensure the segments rested firmly on a bed of packed sand. Construction of the Webster Street Tube started from the Alameda end and progressed towards Oakland, with the precast segments set before additional cast-in-place segments were added at each end.

Each of the Webster segments were of comparable size and configuration to the earlier Posey Tube segments, measuring 200 feet (61 m) long and 37 feet (11 m) in diameter, with walls 2 1/2 feet (0.76 m) thick. However, the Webster segments were equipped with rectangular collars 45 ft × 43 ft (14 m × 13 m) (W×H) at each end, and weighed more, approximately 5,700 short tons (5,200 t) each. The roadway within the Webster Street Tube is 24 feet (7.3 m) wide, and the minimum vertical clearance is 15 ft 1 3/8 in (4.607 m). Including approaches, the Webster Street Tube is 5,923 feet (1,805 m) long, of which 3,350 feet (1,020 m) are underwater.

A novel fluorescent continuous-line lighting system was designed for the Webster Street Tube. Fresh air is supplied through the lower lunette space beneath the roadway, and exhaust is drawn through the upper lunette space above the tube's false ceiling. Each portal building contains four blowers and four exhaust fans, and they are capable of providing nearly 1,000,000 ft^{3}/min (470 m^{3}/s) of airflow in total. Nearly the entire interior surface of the Webster Street Tube is tiled.

The Webster Street Tube project cost more than $20 million in total, including renovations to the older Posey Tube; the construction contract for Webster was US$17,363,000 (equivalent to $182,590,000 in 2025) alone.

== In media ==
- A scene from THX-1138, the first film directed by George Lucas, was shot in the Tube.
- A chase scene of 2003 film Matrix Reloaded takes place in the Webster Tube.
