= Oakland Estuary =

Strait between Alameda Island and the mainland coast of California, United States

Coordinates: 37°47′41.02″N 122°18′54.92″W

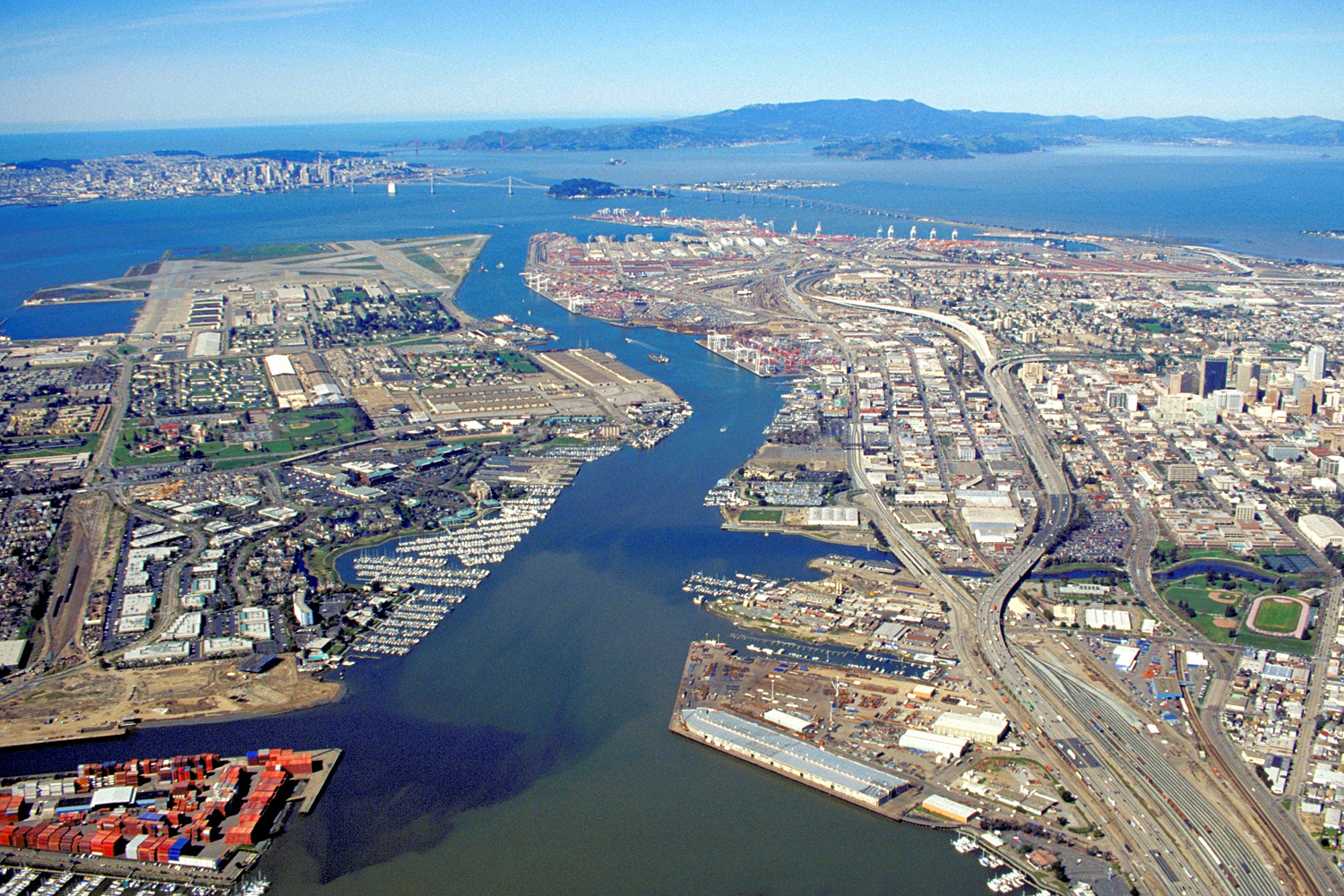
A view over the estuary from above Coast Guard Island. Alameda is on the left, with Oakland on the right and San Francisco Bay in the distance.

The Oakland Estuary is the strait in the San Francisco Bay Area, California, separating the cities of Oakland and Alameda and the Alameda Island from the East Bay mainland. On its western end, it connects to San Francisco Bay proper, while its eastern end connects to San Leandro Bay. Originally known as San Antonia Creek or San Antonio Slough, the waterway was shallow and Marsh-fringed until it was extensively modified in the late 19th and early 20th centuries to serve as a deep-water harbor.

== Early history ==
Alameda Island and connections:
1. Posey and Webster Street tubes
2. Park Street Bridge
3. Fruitvale Bridge
4. High Street Bridge
5. Bay Farm Island Bridge

Although the estuary was used by Native American tribes inhabiting the local area since about 4000 BC, the earliest recorded history of the Oakland Estuary dates primarily from events extending back to the 19th century, as detailed in a research study conducted by Earth Metrics for the U.S. Army Corps of Engineers (Earth Metrics, 1990)(Shreffler, 1994). The Oakland Estuary and tributary stream channels were used for shipping transport regularly by the 1850s; early maritime commerce featured movement of lumber and cattle hides. At this time land west of Lake Merritt Slough consisted of undeveloped marshlands. In 1853 the first dredging project of this estuary was initiated, to enable ferry service to San Francisco. By the late 19th century further landside development occurred featuring wharf expansions, railroad service and shipbuilding.

== Geography ==
The Estuary runs roughly east to west for several miles between the Oakland shoreline on the north and Alameda on the south. It includes the Inner Harbor, Middle Harbor, and the Brooklyn Basin area. The man-made Tidal Canal forms the eastern connection to San Leandro Bay. Coast Guard Island lies within the Estuary.

== Harbor improvements and the Tidal Canal ==
In 1873, the U.S. Congress authorized the Army Corps of Engineers to study improvements to the harbor. The following year, Colonel George H. Mendell, then commander of the Corps’ Western District, submitted a multi-phase plan. The plan called for training walls to concentrate tidal currents, deepening of the shipping channel, enlargement of the tidal basin later known as Brooklyn Basin, and construction of a canal across the neck of the Alameda peninsula so that tidal waters from San Leandro Bay could help wash out the main channel.

Work proceeded slowly because of limited congressional appropriations. Excavation of the Tidal Canal itself occurred in two main periods: 1889-1892 and 1901-1903. The canal was created by a locomotive, shovel, and cars from the San Francisco Bridge Company that created the 1.5 mile-long canal.

In August of 1902 the final barrier was removed and water flowed freely through the canal, converting Alameda from a peninsula into an island. A three-day public celebration, the Alameda Water Carnival took place in September 1902 on Coast Guard Island (Originally Government Island).

== Twentieth Century developments and the Port of Oakland ==
The Gold Rush and establishment of railroads to the west in the latter half of the 1800s increased Oakland’s importance as a transportation center. The Port of Oakland was established as an official department in 1927. During World War II, the port served as a major military supply depot. After the war, it became one of the first large West Coast ports to adopt containerized shipping. In 1962, Sea Land Service began regular container operations at the Port of Oakland, and the port invested in specialized terminals and container cranes.

== Crossings ==
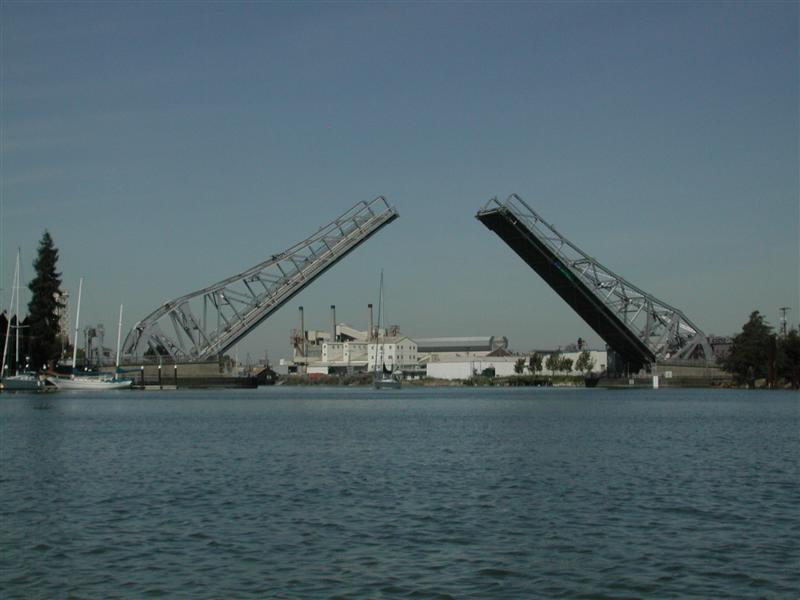
High Street Bridge

The estuary is spanned by two underwater tubes and three bridges. They are, from west to east:

- Webster Street Tube
- Posey Tube
- Park Street Bridge
- Fruitvale Bridge
- High Street Bridge

== Facilities ==
Facilities along the navigable route include the Port of Oakland, Naval Air Station Alameda and Coast Guard Base Alameda located on an island in the strait. Jack London Square is a publicly accessible mixed-use waterfront and marina area where the museum ship, USS Potomac (AG-25), is docked. There are several marinas, some with liveaboards.
