= Bay Farm Island, Alameda, California =

Peninsula in the San Francisco East Bay, US

Bay Farm Island
Nickname: Asparagus Island
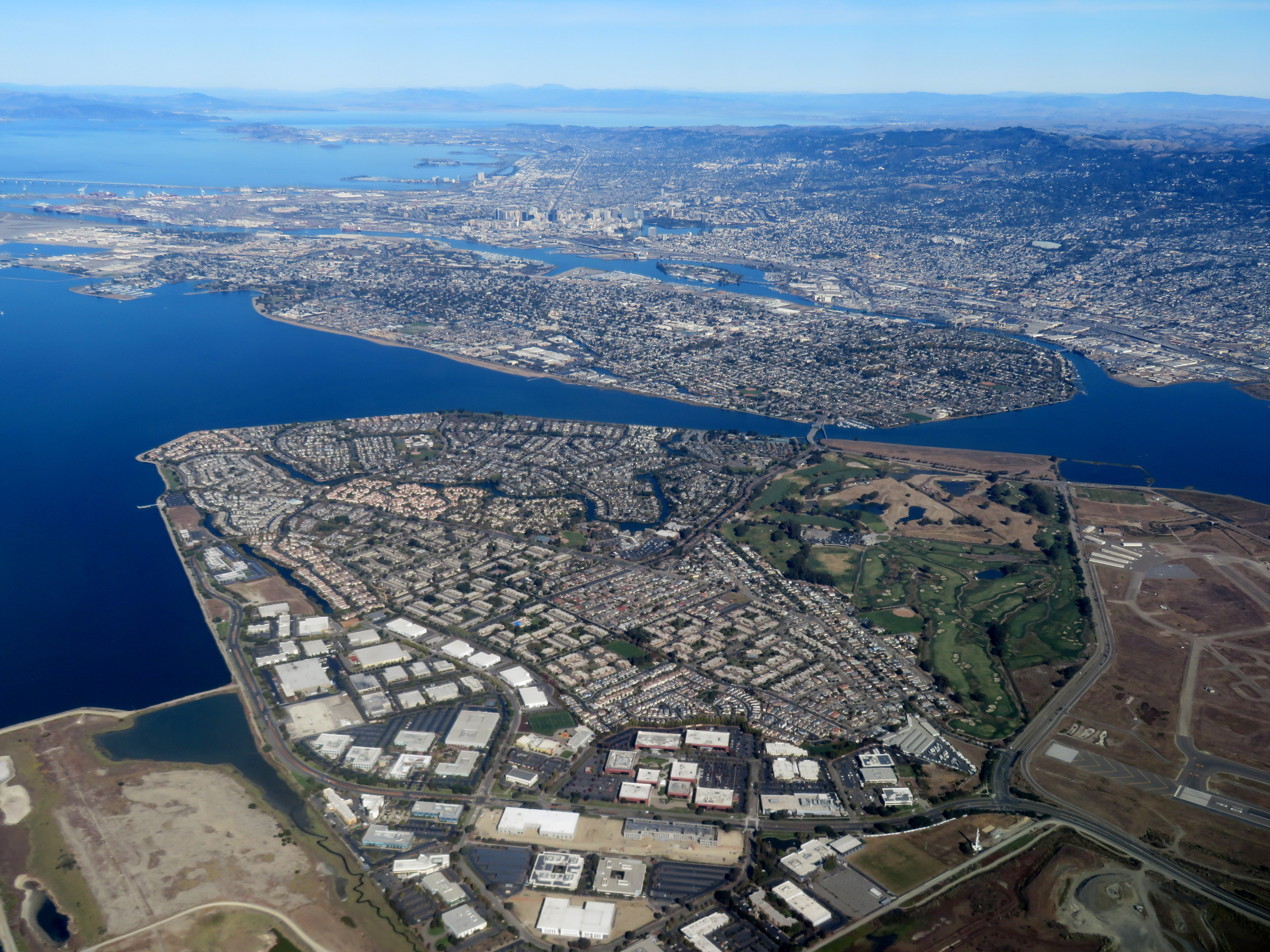
- Aerial view of Bay Farm Island in October 2020

- Location within San Francisco Bay Area Location within California Location within the United States

Geography
- Location: Northern California
- Coordinates: 37.737°N 122.235°W
- Adjacent to: San Leandro Bay
- Total islands: 1

Administration
- United States
- State: California
- County: Alameda
- City: Alameda

Bay Farm Island is a district of the city of Alameda, California, though it is separated from the rest of the city on Alameda Island by an estuary of San Leandro Bay. Its ZIP code is 94502. The location was originally an island in San Francisco Bay, but due to land reclamation, it has become a peninsula and is now connected to the mainland of Oakland and Oakland International Airport. Marshes and other areas of the island were also reclaimed.

Prior to 20th century development, Bay Farm Island was farmland with asparagus being the principal crop, thus it was also formerly known as Asparagus Island. In addition, the area was the site of large oyster beds which regularly supplied restaurants in nearby San Francisco.

Bay Farm is home to the 36-hole Chuck Corica Golf Complex, office and retail complexes, and several housing developments. There is a chain of lagoons as well as several community parks including Shoreline Park. Two elementary schools and one private school serve the island: Bay Farm Elementary, Amelia Earhart Elementary, and Coastline Christian Schools. Bay Farm was the home of the headquarters of the Oakland Raiders when the team was in Oakland from 1995 until 2020, and is currently the home of the headquarters of the Oakland Roots SC, and Oakland Soul SC.

A greenbelt is also present which encompasses the perimeter of the peninsula.

== Harbor Bay Isle ==
The largest development on Bay Farm is named "Harbor Bay Isle", generally bounded to the north and west portion of the island by Island Drive and Mecartney Road. Harbor Bay Isle is divided into seven villages; six villages cover twenty homeowner's associations in each of the residential subdivisions, and one village covers commercial interests, including the Harbor Bay business park. Harbor Bay Isle excludes the three southern townhome developments, Islandia, Casitas, and Garden Isle, as well as the single-family homes to the east of Island Drive. Much of the development is built on reclaimed land.

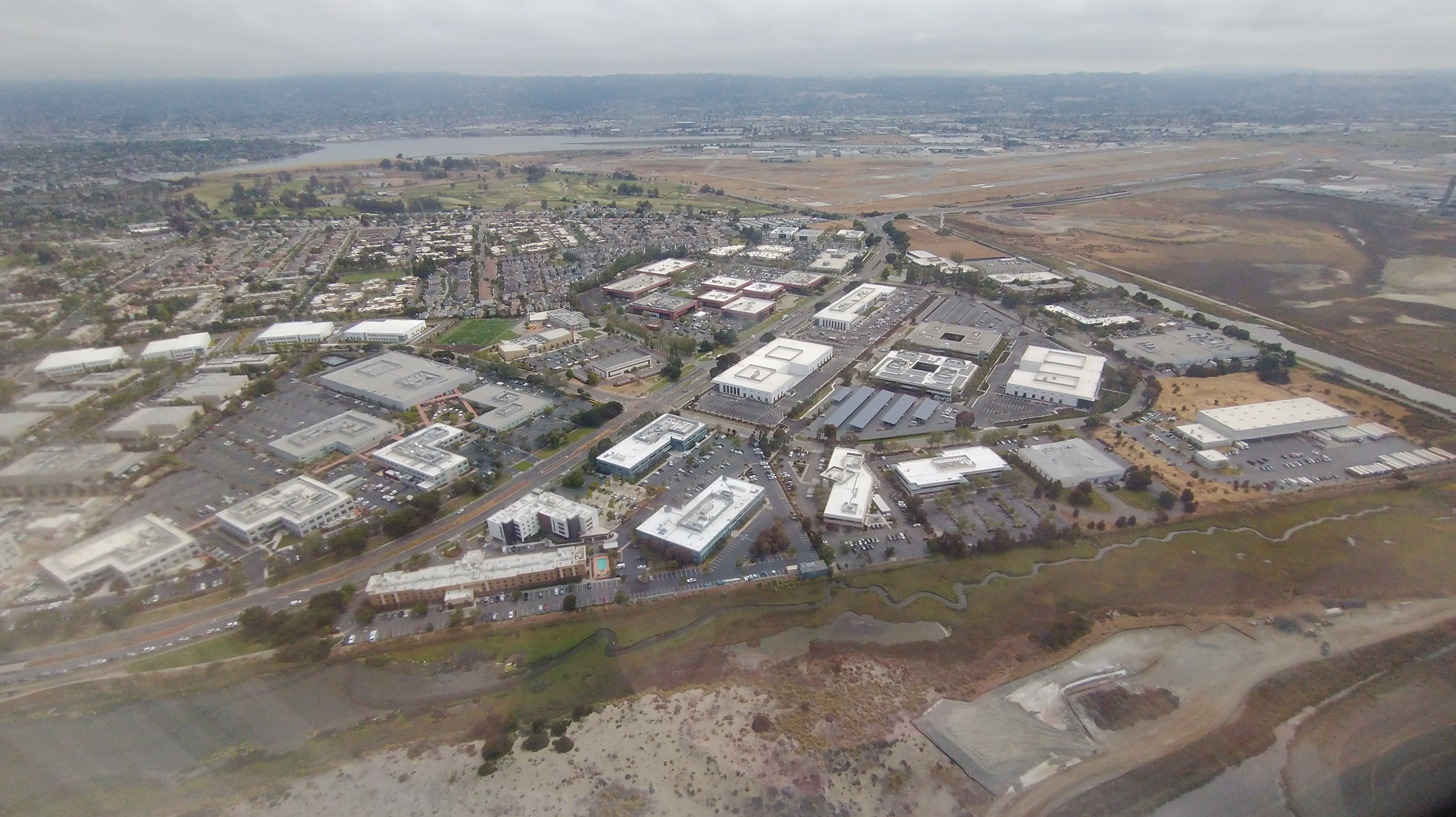
Harbor Bay business park

== Southern Crossing ==
Bay Farm was proposed as a site for the eastern end of another bridge from San Francisco across San Francisco Bay. The so-called Southern Crossing was first conceptualized in the 1940s and canceled in 1958.

== Schools ==
There are two elementary schools on Bay Farm Island: Bay Farm Elementary, and Amelia Earhart Elementary. The latter is named for aviator Amelia Earhart, who started many of her flights from the nearby Oakland Airport. There is also a private school, Coastline Christian Schools (Formerly known as Chinese Christian Schools).

== Notable residents ==
- Chris Isaak, recording artist
- David Segui, former MLB first baseman
- Jim Otto, former center for Oakland Raiders
- Stan Bunger, radio broadcast journalist
- Scott Brosius, MLB third baseman, World Series MVP
- Billy Joe Hobert, American football player

== Public transit ==
AC Transit provides local bus service in addition to express commuter "Transbay" service to the Transbay Terminal in Downtown San Francisco. In the weekday mornings and afternoons there are student only bus rides from neighborhoods on Bay Farm Island to various local schools.

The free Harbor Bay Business Park Shuttle connects the Harbor Bay Ferry Terminal with the Harbor Bay Business Park and Oakland Coliseum station.

In addition, the Harbor Bay Ferry provides commuter (rush hour) service to the San Francisco Ferry Building.

== See also ==
- Islands of San Francisco Bay
