= Alameda (island) =

Island in San Francisco Bay, California

Alameda Island
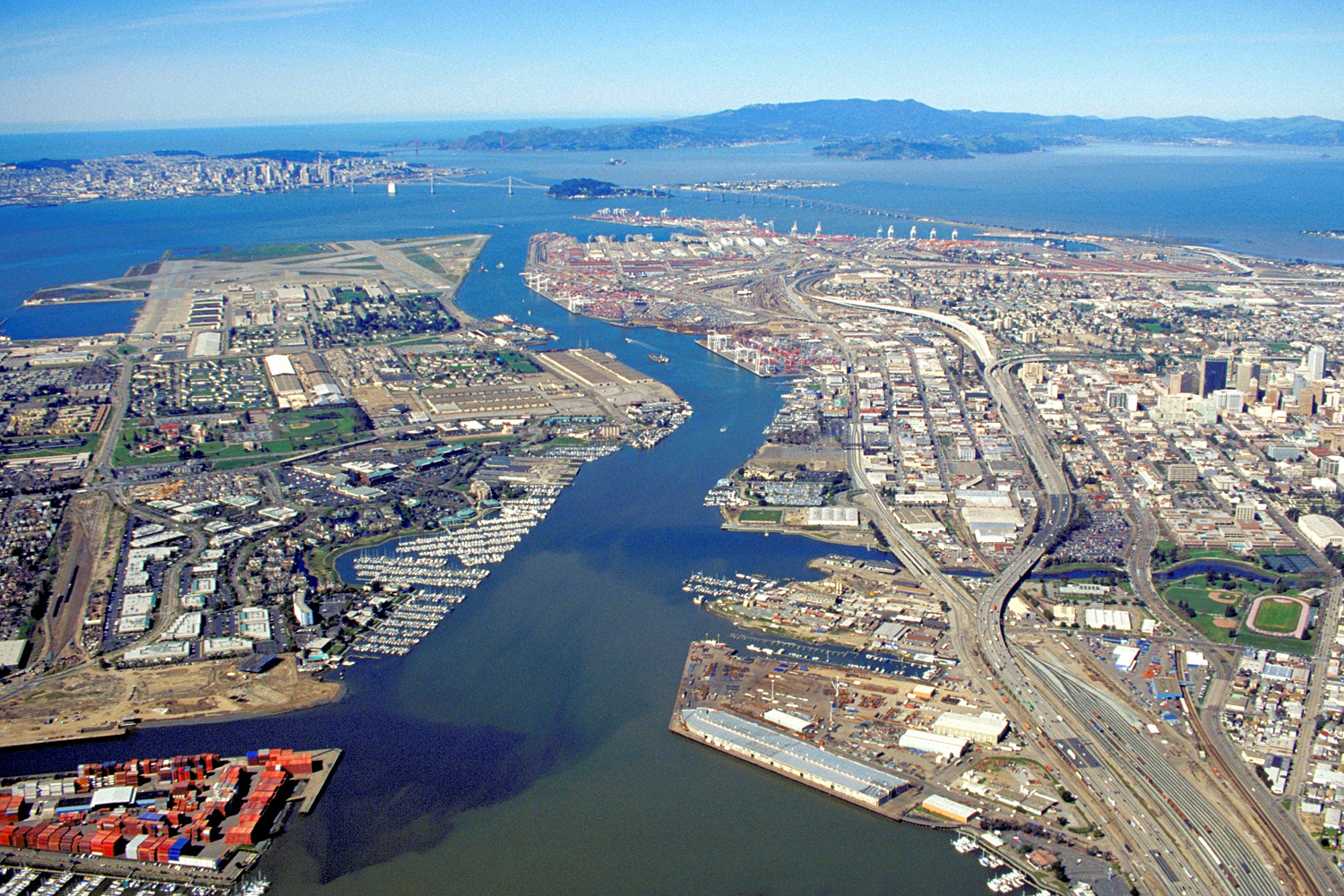
- Aerial view of the north end of Alameda Island (left), with Oakland on the right and San Francisco in the background
- Interactive map of Alameda Island

Geography
- Location: San Francisco Bay, California
- Coordinates: 37°46′36″N 122°16′40″W
- Coastline: 9.25 km (5.748 mi)

Administration
- United States
- State: California

Alameda Island is an island located in San Francisco Bay in California. It is south and west of, and adjacent to, Oakland, and across the bay eastward from San Francisco. Located on the island is most of the city of Alameda, a city in Alameda County. A very small western tip of the island's territory is technically part of San Francisco; however, this is uninhabited and is not separately managed.

Once located on the island was the Naval Air Station Alameda, a defunct naval air station. The island was originally a peninsula and a part of Oakland and is now separated from the mainland by the Oakland Estuary. The island is connected to the mainland by six bridges: the Park Street Bridge, the Fruitvale Railroad Bridge, the Miller Sweeney Road Bridge, the High Street Bridge, the Bay Farm Island Bridge, and the Bayfarm Island Bicycle Draw Bridge. The Posey and Webster Street tubes also connect Oakland to Alameda Island.

== History ==
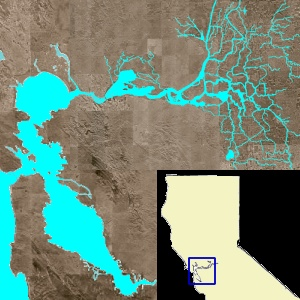
False color image of San Francisco Bay, showing Alameda Island as the largest island in the bay, just off the mainland of the East Bay, across from the end of the San Francisco Peninsula

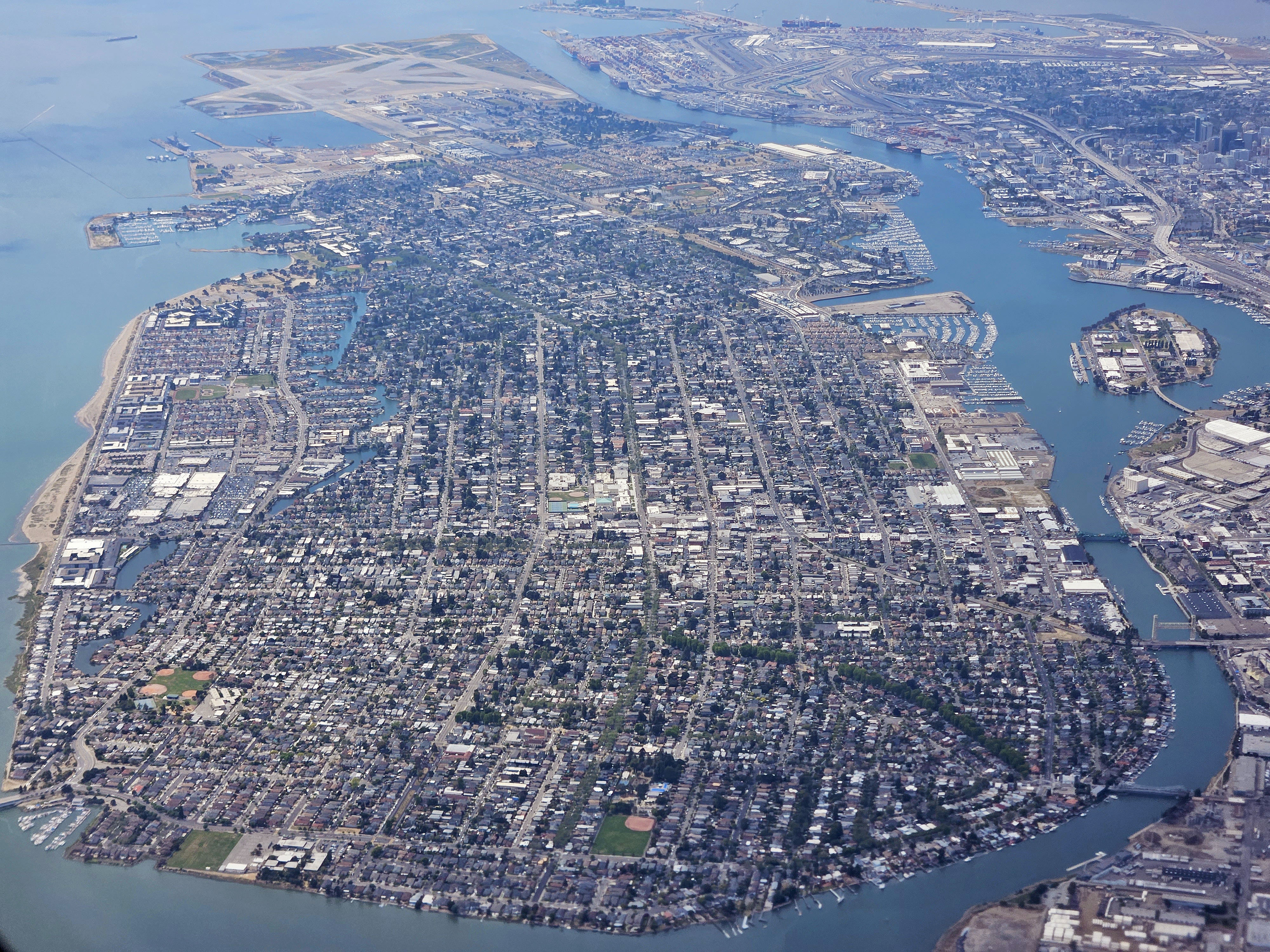
Aerial photo of Alameda Island from the southeast, looking northwest towards San Francisco

The island was originally a peninsula connected to Oakland. Much of it was low-lying and marshy, but on higher ground, the peninsula and adjacent parts of what is now downtown Oakland were home to one of the largest coastal oak forests in the world. The area was therefore called Encinal, Spanish for "oak grove". Alameda is Spanish for "grove of poplar trees" or "tree-lined avenue", and was chosen in 1853 by popular vote.

The inhabitants at the time of the arrival of the Spanish in the late 18th century were a local band of the Ohlone tribe. The peninsula became part of the vast Rancho San Antonio granted to Luis Peralta by the viceroyalty under King Ferdinand VII of Spain. The grant was later confirmed by the new Republic of Mexico upon its independence from Spain.

Over time, the place became known as Bolsa de Encinal or Encinal de San Antonio. The island was created in 1902 with the opening of a canal on the south side to enhance tidal scouring to keep the estuary to the north cleared for shipping. Landfill was added around the island and stopped once the island had been extended over the San Francisco border.

The island contains many Victorian homes built in the late 1800s and early 1900s. Nearly the entire island has been developed. There are several miles of beaches along the south side.
