= San Leandro Bay =

Baylet in the San Francisco Bay

Coordinates: 37.752°N 122.221°W

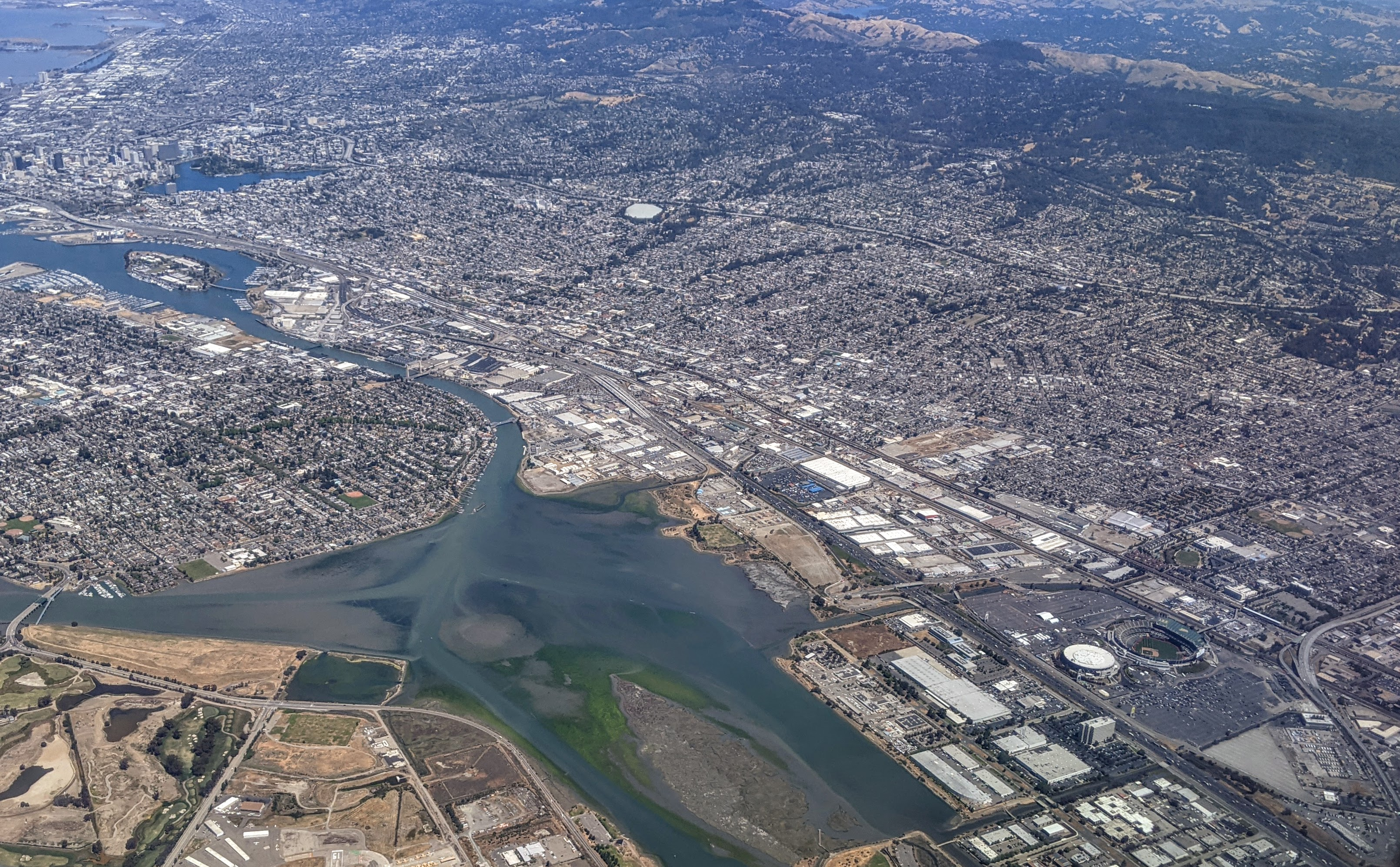
San Leandro Bay and vicinity, aerial from the south, including the nearby Oakland Arena and Oakland Coliseum

San Leandro Bay is a body of water in the San Francisco Bay. It is connected to the Oakland Estuary today, but was originally separated by land which formerly connected Alameda with Oakland. It is located along the east of Oakland San Francisco Bay Airport and Bay Farm Island. The principal stream which flows into San Leandro Bay is San Leandro Creek. Other tributaries include the East Creek/Peralta Creek watershed and the Lion Creek/Arroyo Viejo watershed. Damon Marsh is located there.

== Pollution ==
San Leandro Bay has been studied extensively with regard to pollution, due to the industry present in the surrounding area. Historical pollution has led to accumulations of PCBs, DDT, trace metals and other contaminants of concern. San Leandro Bay has many ongoing and planned restoration projects to reverse past environmental damage, including a planned treatment wetland which will stop excess nutrient pollution and other contaminants from being released into the Bay from the San Leandro wastewater treatment plant.
