= H.P. Nielsen =

Danish-American aviator

H. P. Nielsen
- Born: 21 May 1859; Denmark
- Died: 11 September 1945 (aged 86); Alameda, California, US
- Resting place: Grave at Mountain View Cemetery, Oakland, California
- Monuments: Historic Home - House of Aeon 2254 Santa Clara Ave. Alameda, CA
- Citizenship: Danish (1859-1892); American (1892-death)
- Occupations: Firefighter; Engineer; Inventor; Mechanic; Machinist
- Employer(s): Self; Alameda Fire Department; Municipal Electric Light Plant; HP Nielsen & Son
- Known for: Building the first biplane in Alameda, California in 1910
- Spouses: Hansine Christine (m. 1883) Lilly Palmer (m. 1933)
- Children: 4

Notes
- Charter member of the Alameda Loyal Order of Moose; Charter member of the Fraternal Order of Eagles

Hans Peter Nielsen (May 21, 1859 – September 11, 1945) was a Danish-born American machinist, mechanic, engineer, fireman, and inventor who lived most of his life in Alameda, California. In 1910 Nielsen built the Merle 1910 Biplane, the first biplane in Alameda, commissioned by Adrian J Merle. An early adopter of automobile technology, he also believed in the potential represented by aviation.

Mr. Nielsen announces that there is no question to be raised against his prognostication that in a few years aeroplane parties will be common. He states that by the time of the Pacific-Panama exposition in San Francisco, many of the now motor enthusiasts will fly to San Francisco in their ships of the air. He believes that the exposition authorities will provide landing places for their aerial guests.

— "Airship Shop For This City", Times-Star (1910-01-24)

Nielsen was also a firefighter who innovated several firefighting devices, and was the first engineer at the Alameda Electric Light Plant. As a prominent member of the Alameda community his activities were frequently covered in local newspapers, often under the misspelling "Nielson."

== Early life ==
Hans Peter Nielsen was born in Denmark in 1855. He married his wife Hansine Christine (1853 – 1925) in 1883, and the following year he traveled to the United States for the first time. Nielsen returned to Denmark in 1886. He, Hansine, and their children Augusta and Christian sailed to San Francisco in 1887 and settled in Alameda. The ship manifest lists Nielsen's occupation as Watchmaker.

Nielsen became a naturalized citizen on July 27, 1892. He and Hansine had two more children in California: Ella and Adolph. As of the 1920 Census Hansine reported having given birth to 8 children, but only Augusta, Ella, and Adolph still lived.

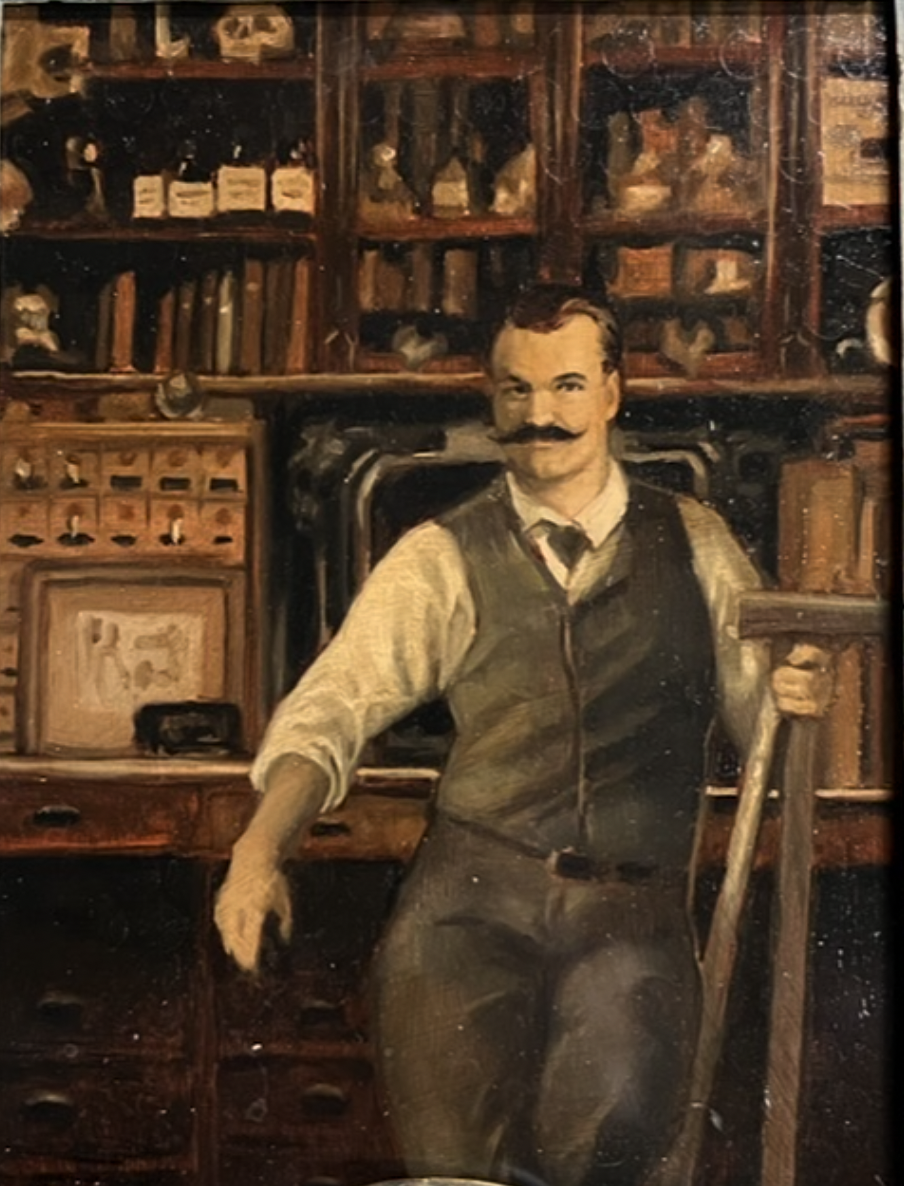
Portrait of Hans Peter Nielsen in his study, 1911

== Career ==
=== Firefighter ===
Nielsen joined the Alameda Fire Department in 1890 as the "first paid Alameda city fireman." He served as engineer of the Encinal Steamer No. 1, a horse-drawn engine with a steam pumper. Nielsen's idiosyncratic methods made an impression on his fellow firefighters:

Early-day firemen still speak of how Nielsen would get steam up in the pumper faster than anyone else by using a little 'primer' of gunpowder.

— "Funeral Rites Set For Tomorrow For Veteran Fireman of Alameda", Oakland Tribune (1945-09-13)

=== Alameda Electric Light ===
In 1901, Nielsen left the Fire Department to become the first engineer at the Alameda Electric Light Plant. Alameda Municipal Power is the oldest municipal electrical utility west of the Mississippi, and from 1887 until 1902 provided Alameda with electric street lights. In 1902, the Alameda Electric Light Plant sub-station also began to offer electrical power to homes and businesses.

=== Automobile repairman ===
Nielsen repaired automobiles as proprietor of the Encinal Garage in Alameda. In 1909 Nielsen was also issued a permit for him to build a $600 machine shop building behind his home at 2254 Santa Clara Avenue, known as the House of Aeon.

Even as Nielsen was working on flying machines in his backyard shop, his Encinal garage reportedly hired "a couple of men" to assist with the motor line during the busy spring season of 1910.

In 1912, the city of Alameda awarded Nielsen a contract for construction of a tractor to pull the Fire Station No. 1 hook-and-ladder truck. The contract for $800 specified that the tractor would be equipped with pneumatic front tires and a 35-horsepower Toledo engine, and guaranteed to draw the truck at 20 miles per hour. Further, the engine had to detachable, with the ability to hitch the truck to horses within five minutes.

=== Aeroplane builder ===
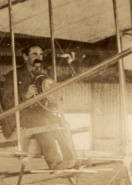
Nielsen in his biplane, 1910

Nielsen studied the new science of aviation, including making close examination of planes flown by aviator Louis Paulhan, and had made designs for several aircraft. He did not have the funds to manufacture these designs himself. In 1910, he met businessman Adrian J Merle at an aviation meet in San Francisco. Merle had recently flown as a passenger at a Los Angeles aviation meet, and was determined to start manufacturing aircraft.

On January 23, 1910, Nielsen announced to a group of automobile enthusiasts his intention to begin manufacturing aircraft. With financial backing from Adrian and Isadore Merle, Nielsen expected to start construction in weeks.

In early February Nielsen announced that he was indeed ready to start construction of airplanes at once, beginning with orders for two biplanes and one monoplane. Nielsen anticipated completion of the first airplane in two months: "a plane for pleasure purposes that will combine speed and safety ... about thirty feet in width, and [with the] capacity of carrying two passengers."

The Nielson [sic] biplane is to be thirty-eight feet in length, the tail being carried eighteen feet in the rear of the aeronaut's seat. Ahead of the operator is a plane, twenty feet in length and about five feet in breadth. With this and the tail the general lateral guidance of the plane will be controlled.

The wings of the aeroplane are each to be twenty feet in length, and are now waiting to be fitted to the remainder of the airship.

The motor will be a forty-five horse power, six cylinder vertical engine, capable of developing great speed. It will drive a two bladed propeller, made of hickory and eight feet in diameter.

The aeroplane will have a carrying capacity of two persons, and will weigh only 880 pounds when fully equipped and ready for flight. This is several hundred pounds lighter than any other vessel of the kind and size.

— "First Airship In Alameda Near Completion", Alameda Star (1910-09-03)

Building Merle's biplane took months longer than anticipated, and by September Nielsen was in a race with another local engineer, William Gorham, to build Alameda's first working airplane. Both craft were described as a cross between Curtiss and Farman models.

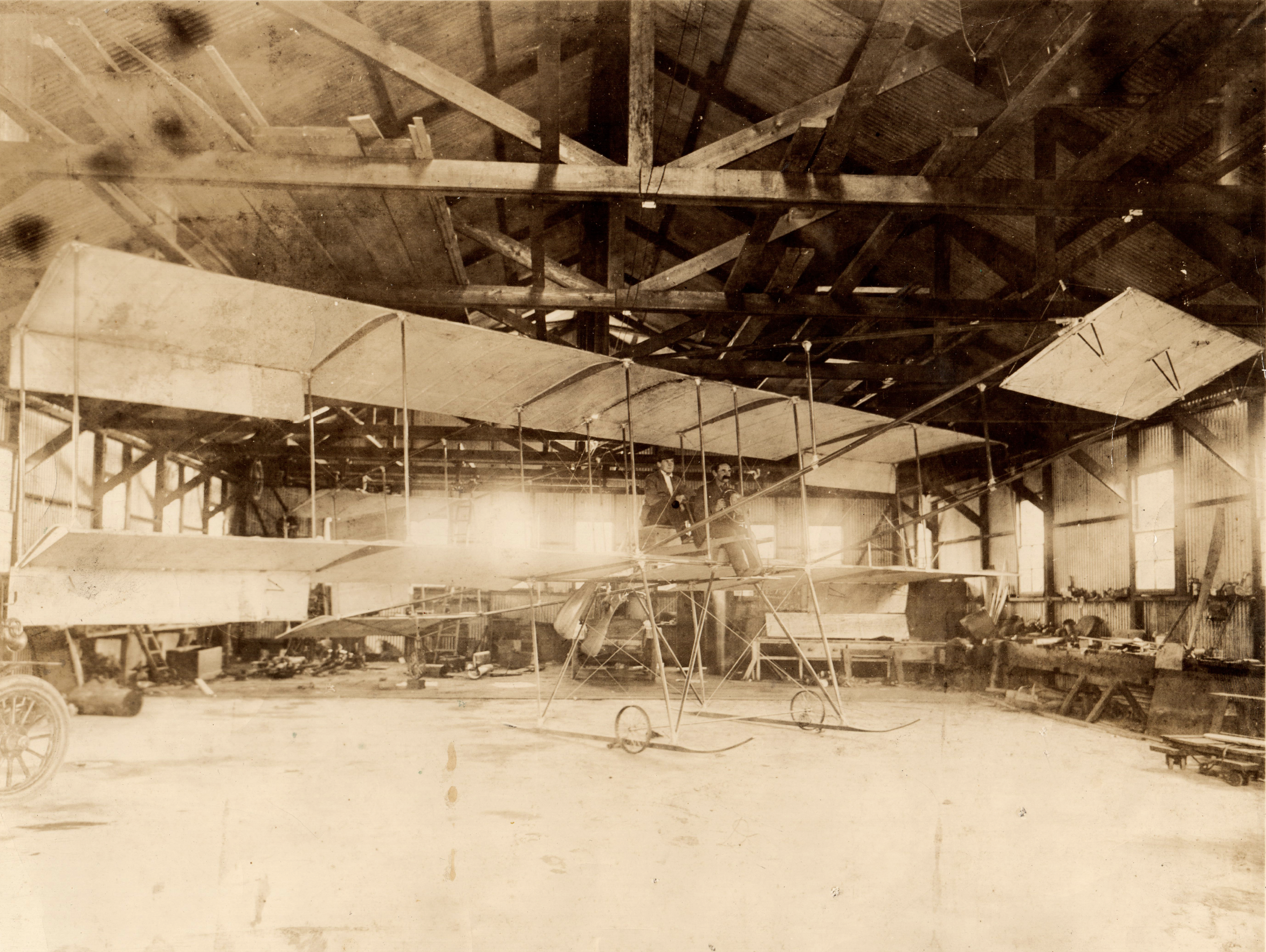
This Farman-type biplane, constructed in 1910 by Hans P. Nielsen for Adrian J. Merle, was the first airplane ever built in Alameda. The newly assembled craft sits inside Nielsen's machine shop at 2254 Santa Clara Avenue

Gorham's plane was described as a 120-pound craft with a six-cylinder, 30 horsepower engine and a 30-foot span. Nielsen's much larger airplane had a 45 horse power six-cylinder engine, 40-foot span, a record wing area of 740 square feet, and weighed about 800 pounds. Nielsen had designed his larger, heavier airplane with the inexperienced aviator in mind:

The Curtiss biplane will go about twenty-seven miles an hour when it first rises from the ground, but in learning to fly this speed is inadvisable, and for that reason I made a large ship, which will go slowly, making a dangerous accident almost impossible. Merle and I propose to take the biplane out in the country, where we can get a level tract of ground. Mr. Merle is in the game for the sport of it. He rode in the Curtiss machine in Los Angeles and got the fever.

— Hans P Nielsen in, "Local Men Will Try Bird Stunts", Alameda Star (1910-09-03)

Merle tested Nielsen's aeroplane at the Stockton Airport in September 1910. The biplane was too heavy for sustained flight, only managing to remain airborne for a few hundred feet at a time. The plane was dismantled and kept in Merle's basement for decades afterwards, but never flew again. Nielsen is not reported to have completed any other aircraft.

== Inventions ==
=== Firefighting innovations ===
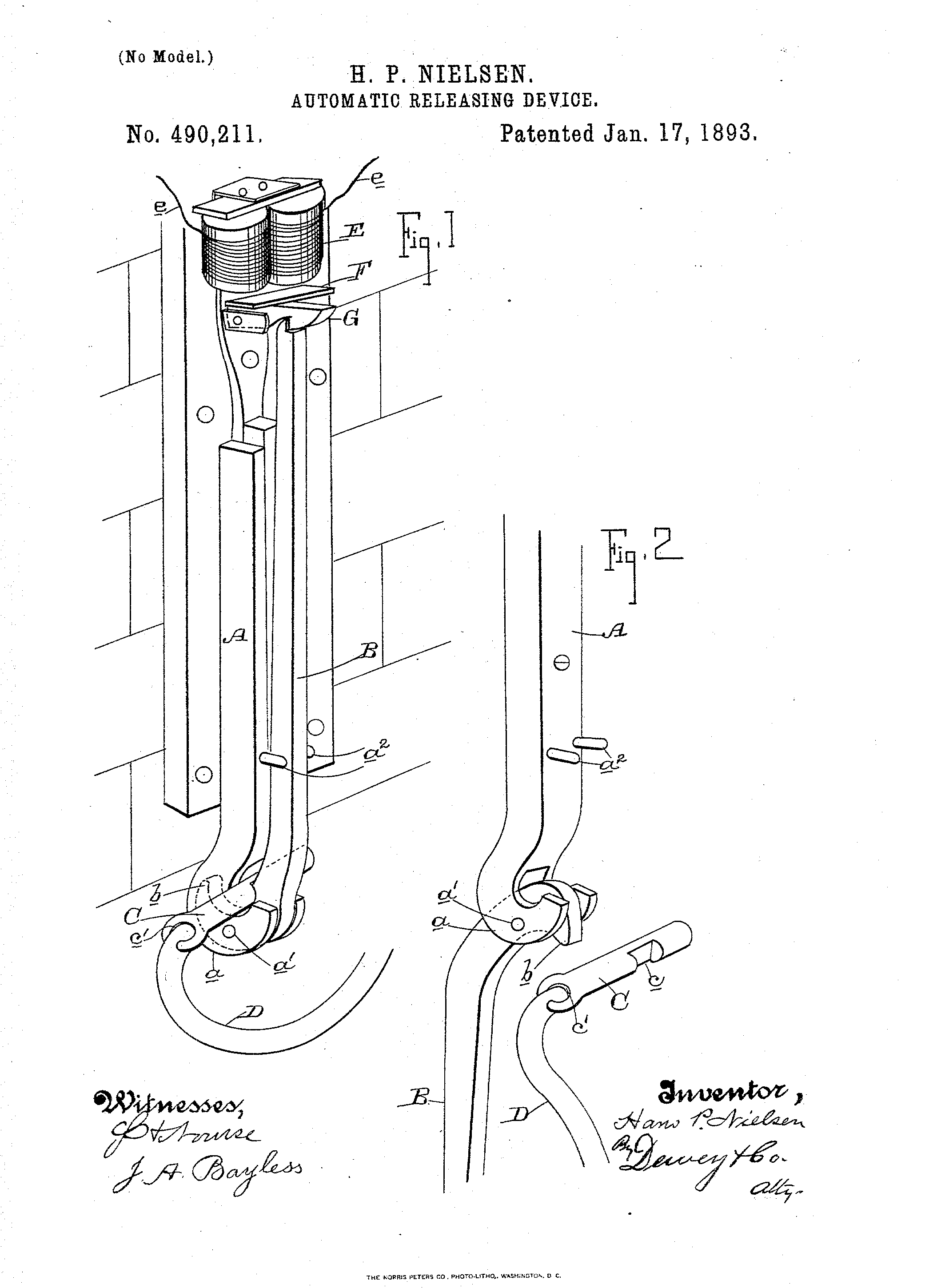
US Patent 490211, a device for unhitching animals patented by Nielsen in 1893.

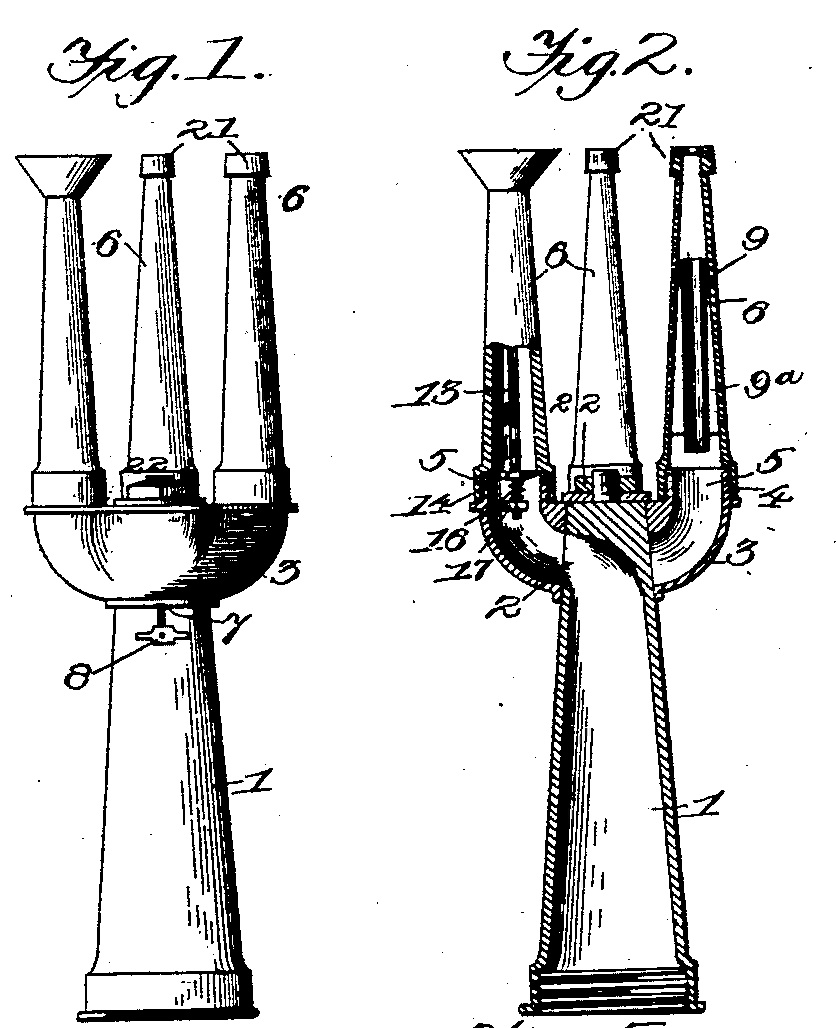
Detail of US Patent 580142, a fire hose fog nozzle Nielsen patented with fire chief Frederick Keller Krauth, Jr in 1897.

Nielsen, credited as the "father" of the modern fog-spray fire hose nozzle, now generally used to fight oil and gasoline fires, joined the Alameda Fire Department in 1890.

— "Funeral Rites set for Tomorrow for Veteran Fireman of Alameda ", Oakland Tribune (1945-09-13)

In 1892, after two years with the Alameda Fire Department, Nielsen submitted a patent for an Automatic Releasing Device "which can be applied to the releasing of hitched animals, such as horses in fire houses." He was granted US Patent 490211 the next year.

Nielsen and Alameda Fire Chief Frederick Keller Krauth, Jr. registered US Patent 580142 in 1897 for an improved Hose Nozzle. Their multi-headed design included a novel method of switching between a single stream, a double stream, and a wider spray, anticipating the modern manually adjustable fog nozzle. This design was used by the Alameda Fire Department and others.

=== Workshop inventions ===
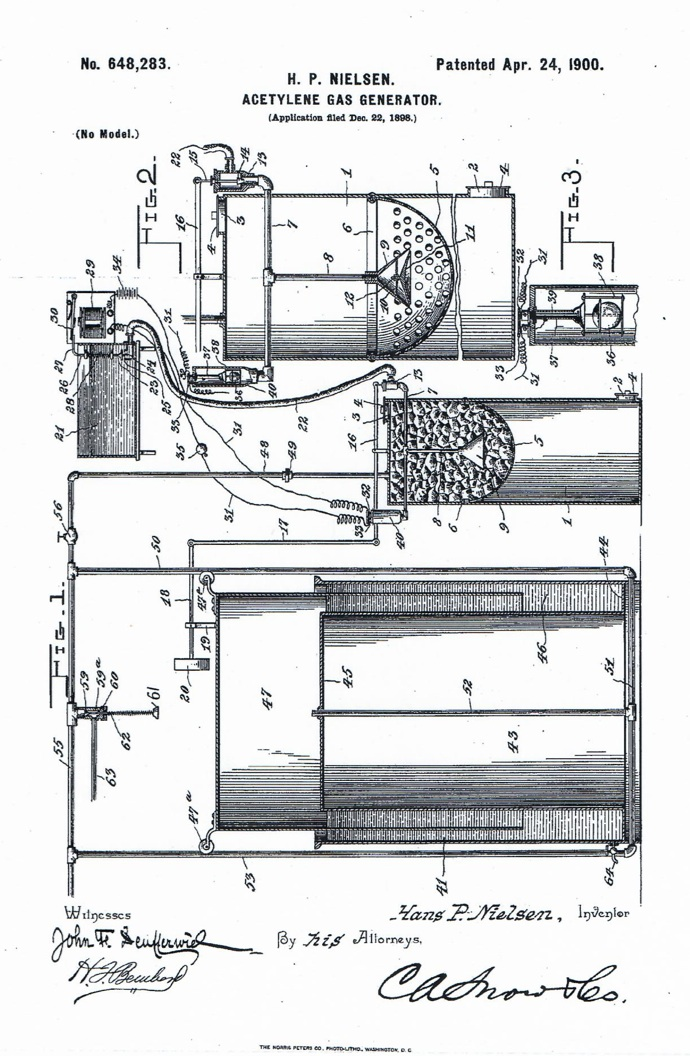
US Patent 648238, an acetylene gas generator devised by HP Nielsen.

In 1898, Nielsen filed a patent for an Acetylene Gas Generator. His central drip generator, designed for use in automobiles and similar portable lamps, proposed to use calcium carbide to generate gas as well as to dehydrate the gas after production. When the carbide was spent, the mechanism would cut off the flow of water and automatically give an alarm. When US Patent 648283 was awarded in 1900, local newspapers celebrated Nielsen's patent for a "gas generator" or "acetylene gas meter."

In January 1910 the Alameda Times-Star reported that "H.P. Nielson [sic], an automobile expert of this city," had patented an electrical automobile starter. No such patent can be found, and it is likely that the newspaper misattributed a foreign patent by Herman Nielsen to the local inventor.

Similarly, in 1912 the Times-Star announced that Nielsen had, patented a new electric welding device in partnership with Otto Beckman of Oakland, but no matching patent has been found.

=== Caster wheel designs ===
In the late 1920s, Nielsen patented several inventions related to caster wheels. Nielsen is listed as assignor to the Eames Company of San Francisco. This company, maker of "invalid chairs, steel wheels and rubber tired ball bearing wheel goods," was owned by Adrian J Merle, for whom Nielsen had built a biplane in 1910.

In 1927, Nielsen patented an improved caster wheel to solve the problem of tire creep and side flex under heavy load: US Patent 1636483.His wheel structure included disks clamped to either side of the wheel, and a webbed fabric structure integrated into the rubber of the tire. In the same year, Nielsen filed a patent for Wheel Structures comprising a swivel caster with ball bearings. He refiled in 1930, and was granted US Patent 1749502. The same year he filed and was issued a patent for a caster wheel brake structure, US Patent 1785421.

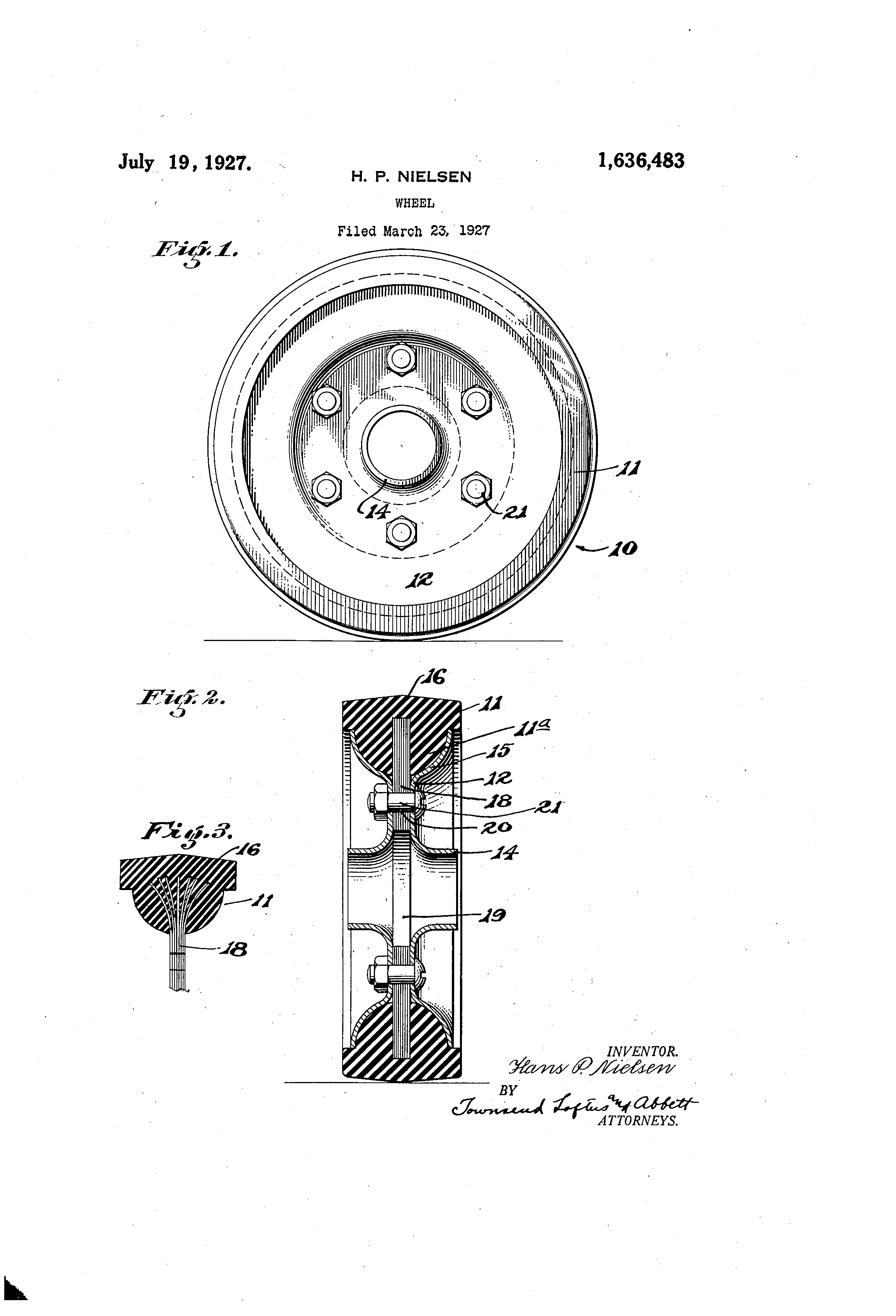
US Patent 1636483, "Wheel"

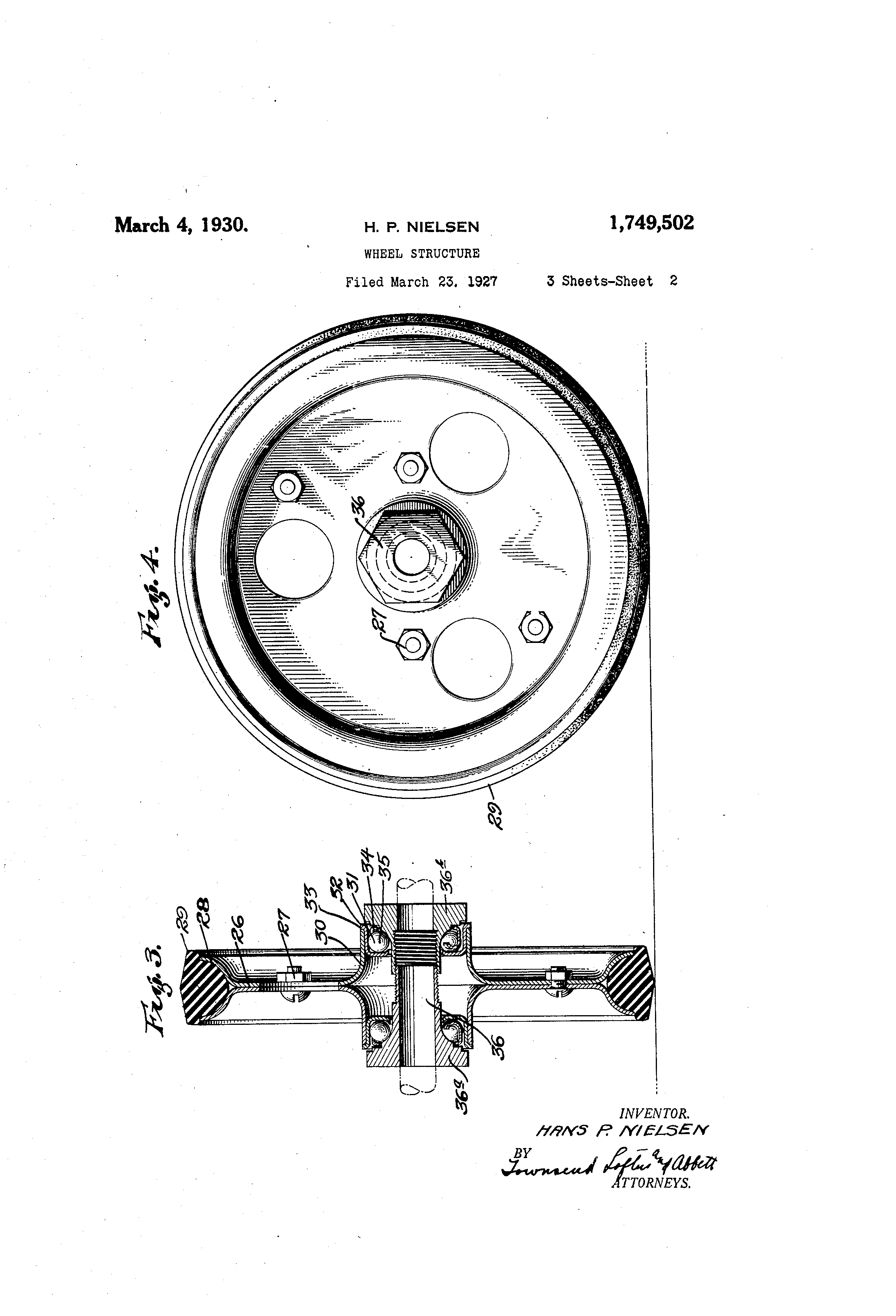
US Patent 1749502, "Wheel Structure"

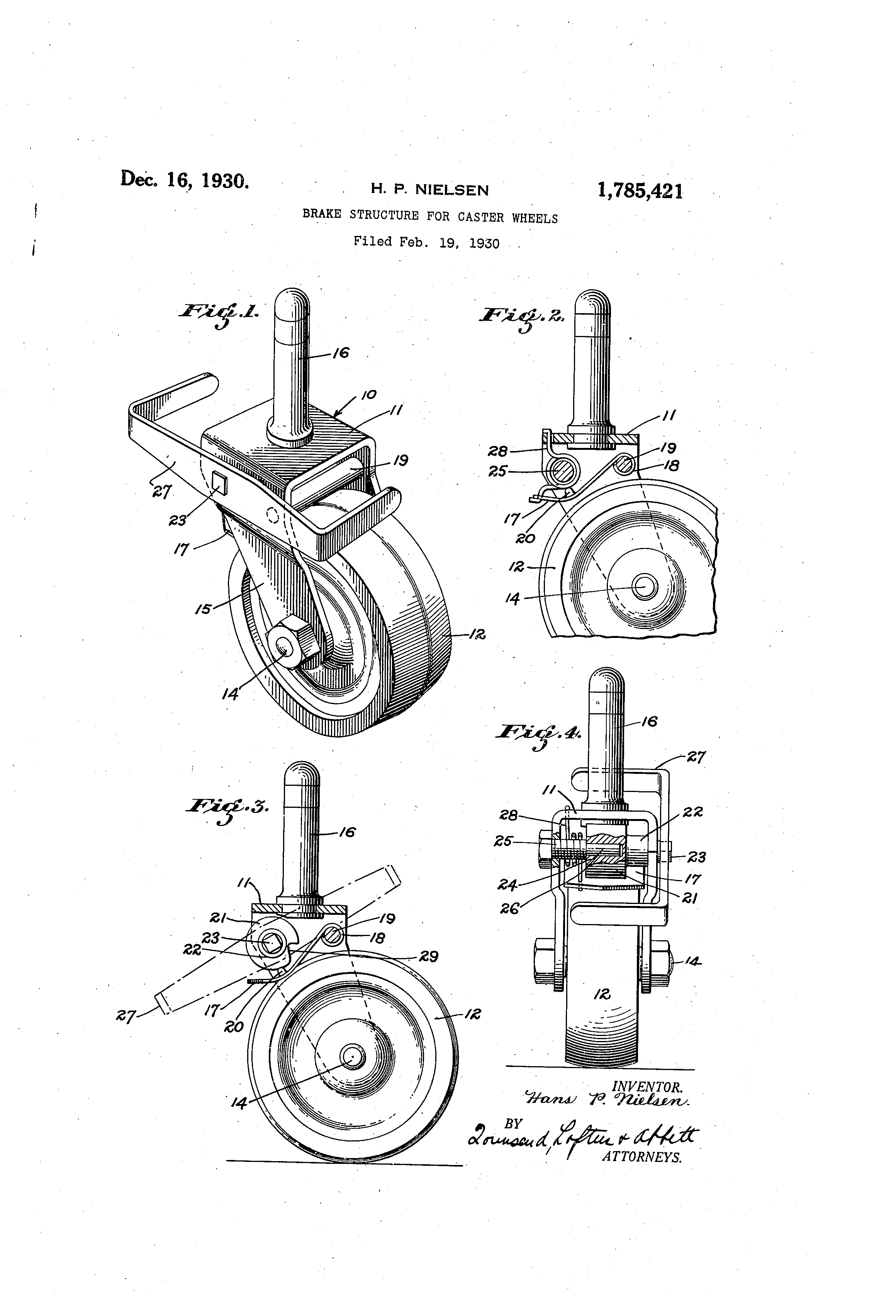
US Patent 1785421, "Brake Structure for Caster Wheels"

Inventions which Nielsen patented as assignor to the Eames Company.

== Personal life ==
Nielsen and his family were subject to frequent news coverage, his name frequently misspelled as "Nielson." Besides his professional accomplishments and inventions, the local press took a keen interest in his injuries, clashes with the law, and second marriage.

=== Injuries and mishaps ===
In 1900, Nielsen made the local Swedish-language newspaper with a work-related injury sustained from a fall from a ladder.

Nielsen and his daughter Augusta were almost killed in an automobile accident during a pleasure drive in 1904. Nielsen lost control of his vehicle on a steep road on the way to Redwood Canyon. Augusta was thrown from the vehicle but avoided injury; Nielsen landed in bushes and barbed wire, and was hurt but not severely. In November, 1907, Augusta was badly injured in an accident at work. The office where she worked as a stenographer was undergoing construction, and she was struck unconscious when a carpenter dropped a door, smashing her head into her typewriter.

Nielsen made front-page news in 1905 when, driving near Sacramento, his automobile was trampled by steers being herded by cattlemen. Although Nielsen was injured and his automobile suffered serious damage, he was able to perform makeshift repairs. He drove to Oakland with a gas lamp as a headlight and a piece of lumber in place of the steering wheel.

In January 1909, the Oakland Tribune reported on Nielsen's bout of food poisoning in San Francisco. "Medical assistance was called in on his arrival home and the prompt use of the stomach pump probably saved Nielson's [sic] life." Just days later, while driving an automobile owned by Dr. J.A. Riley, Nielsen reportedly struck a boy named Bert Smith riding a bicycle. The boy was unhurt.

On February 8, 1910, just days after announcing his plan to build airships, Nielsen suffered a traumatic blood vessel rupture in his leg. His condition remained poor a month later.

In 1913, Nielsen was badly injured by an automobile "kick," possibly in Sacramento. His doctor advised him to keep away from the Bay in order to avoid rheumatism. He headed to San Jose and Paso Robles for a therapeutic mineral and mud bath.

Nielsen suffered another automobile-related injury in 1928, while working in his home garage at the age of 69. A jack slipped while he worked beneath the car, crushing his hand.

=== Clashes with the law ===
In 1904, police officer Dennis Welch had Nielsen arrested on charges that Nielsen's dogs barked at night and kept him from sleeping.

One Hans P. Nielsen, who comes from the land of the Vikings, keeps a park of baying hounds near where the policeman lives. According to the complaint made to-day by Welch, these hounds have not permitted him to sleep by day or night and the only rest that he has had been upon his beat. Upon this showing Judge Tappan issued a warrant for Nielsen's arrest and he was hauled into court. He demanded a jury trial and will get up as his defense that Welch got enough rest upon his beat to satisfy all of the demands of nature, and that a policeman is supposed to be always vigilant and awake.

— "Divine Right of Policemen", San Francisco Call (1904-02-26)

Later that year, one of Nielsen's dogs was reportedly poisoned.

Hans P. Nielsen of Oak Street had a valuable deer hound poisoned yesterday. Nielsen has a number of the animals, and was at one time arrested on a charge of disturbing the peace for allowing the hounds to bay at the moon at night when he resided on Clinton avenue next to the home of Patrolman Dennis Welch.

— "Valuable Dog Poisoned", Oakland Tribune (1904-10-25)

In 1913, Nielsen refused to pay a $36 per year business license for doing manual work as an automobile mechanic. He was arrested and taken before a judge on July 11. As with the dogs in 1904, Nielsen pleaded not guilty and demanded a jury trial. He argued that the ordinance unjustly compelled him to pay a license while blacksmiths, carpenters, and brick masons were not subject to such a license. According to the Oakland Tribune, Nielsen "the artisan" stated in court that if the judge "would pay a license for being a judge, he would be willing to pay for repairing automobiles." He was released on payment of a $50 cash bond.

Nielsen argued against paying for a business license by stating that his garage was simply a repair shop. The Alameda Daily reported that Nielsen argued that he did "not do a garage business, nor deal in supplies or commodities ... and that the only money he receives is what he earns repairing cars." Nonetheless, classified listings indicate that Nielsen regularly sold vehicles from his garage before, during, and after 1913.

=== Second marriage ===
Nielsen's first wife Hansine died in San Rafael, California in 1925, and Nielsen remarried on April 14, 1933. At the age of 78, Nielsen and his former lodger Lilly Palmer, 47, married in Reno. Reno was known as a place for California couples to marry without waiting the three days required by California state law.

The couple separated February 11, 1941. Nielsen pursued a divorce suit, charging Lilly with cruelty. At this point Nielsen was retired without income, and supporting his son Adolph, now blind. Meanwhile, Lilly, "a large strong woman of approximately 52 years of age, was earning $150 per month by using the house as a convalescent home.

Nielsen charges that his wife has announced intention of selling the home at 2254 Santa Clara Avenue, Alameda, for which she holds a deed of trust. He accuses her of cruelty, alleging that on one occasion she "violently and intentionally pushed him into a chair" and said, "I could kill you."

— "Husband Denied Alimony Plea", Oakland Tribune (1941-05-02)

The judge denied Nielsen's request for $65 per month pending the divorce trial, but granted him temporary alimony of $150 to cover his attorney fees and issued a restraining order to prevent Lilly from "conveying or encumbering any of the community property." Six months later, Nielsen dropped his divorce suit 10 minutes before the trial was set to begin, settling with Lilly out of court. The divorce was never finalized, and Lilly was listed as Nielsen's widow in his obituary.
