= Park Street Historic Commercial District =

Area of Alameda County, California, US

- U.S. National Register of Historic Places
- U.S. Historic district
- California Historical Landmark
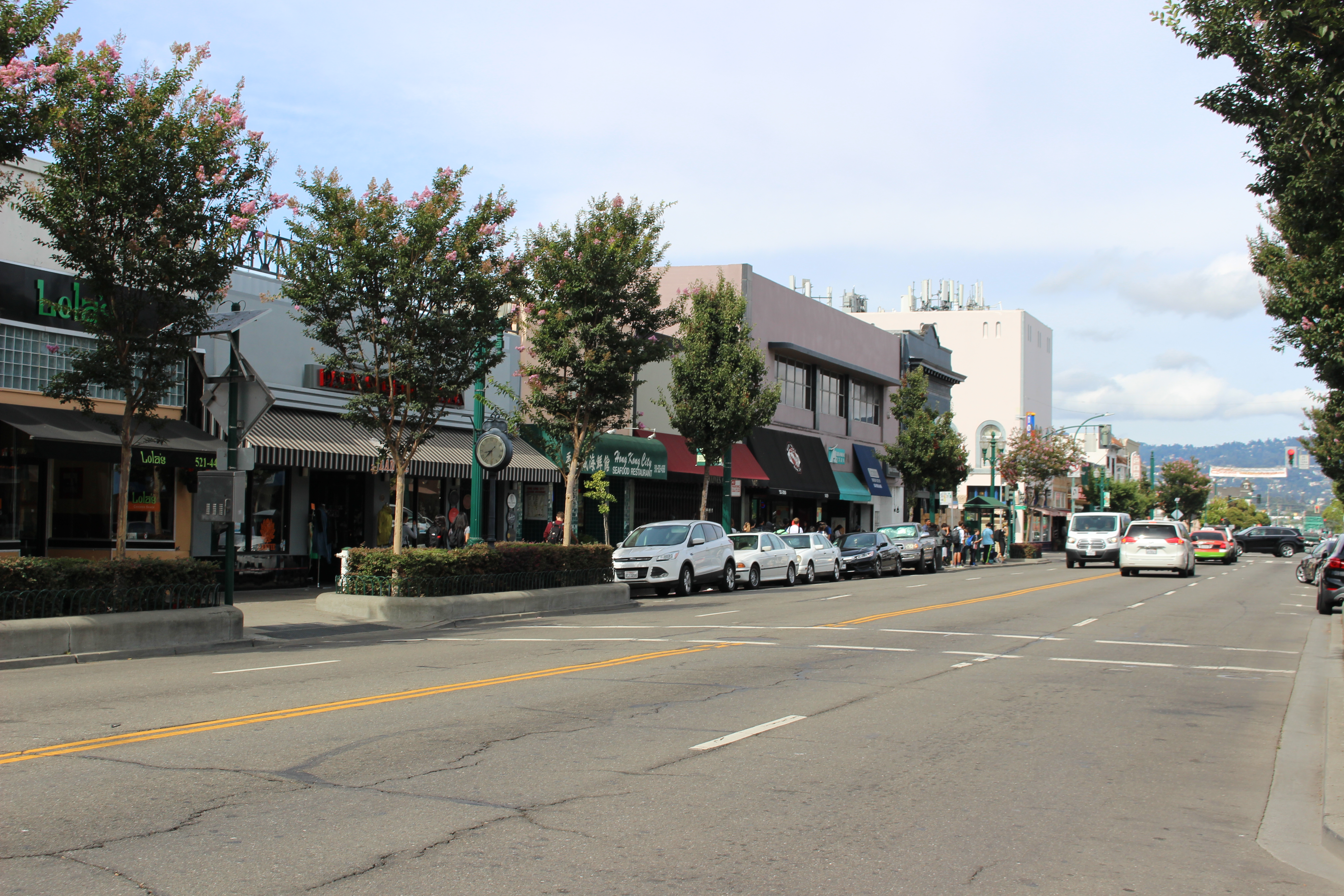

- Location within Oakland, California Location within California
- Location: Roughly bounded by Oak St., Park, Lincoln, and Encinal Aves., Alameda, Alameda County, California, U.S.
- Coordinates: 37.764444°N 122.243611°W
- Area: 6 acres (2.4 ha)
- Architectural style: Late Victorian, Art Deco, Mission Revival/Spanish Revival
- NRHP reference No.: 82002154
- CHISL No.: N1105

Significant dates
- Added to NRHP: May 12, 1982
- Delisted CHISL: May 12, 1982

The Park Street Historic Commercial District, also known as Park Street District, is the downtown neighborhood in Alameda, California. It is on the east side of the island of Alameda, near the Fruitvale Bridge and across the water and from Jingletown in Oakland, California; and is roughly bounded by Oak Street, Park Avenue, Lincoln Avenue, and Encinal Avenue. The earliest part of the area was built in the 1860s–1880s, with the first commercial nodes located near the train lines.

The Park Street Historic Commercial District has been listed as a historic district by the National Register of Historic Places since May 12, 1982; and as a California Historical Landmark (No. N1105) since 1982.

== History ==
The Park Street Historic Commercial District contains 72 contributing buildings, 61 buildings with potential for rehabilitation, and 69 non-contributing buildings.

The 1860s and 1870s brought population growth to the area, and increased the need for a commercial shopping area. It has been a place of business and commerce since 1880. The Alameda railroad station (active from 1864 to 1870), located at Park Street and Railroad Avenue (present-day Lincoln Avenue) gave impetus to the shift of commercial activity in this area. The commercial area was further supported by the relocation of the U.S. Post Office, which was moved after the 1868 Hayward earthquake destroyed the first building. The Post Office had several temporary locations within the Park Street Historic Commercial District, until it got a permanent building in 1912.

In 1872, the towns of Alameda, Encinal and Woodstock (on the west end), were joined together and incorporated as the Town of Alameda with a population of 2,000 persons. After the incorporation local horse-drawn streetcar lines were established in 1875 with connections to Oakland via Park Street. A narrow gauge railroad line, crossing the peninsula along Encinal Avenue was completed in 1878 with a depot at Park Street in the Park Hotel, making it the second railroad in the area (and later demolished in 1965). The earliest commercial nodes in Alameda were located near the cross traffic produced by train lines and the framework for the Park Street commercial development was laid. The Water Works Building, built in 1880 by architect William Patton (demolished in the 1950s), brought civic offices into the commercial district. Electric lights were installed throughout Alameda in 1886.

== Notable contributing buildings ==
- Boehmer Building (1870), 1407–1413 Park Street
- Pampered Pup (1880), 1401 Park Street
- Masonic Temple and Lodge (1891), 1329–1331 Park St. and 2312 Alameda Ave.; NRHP-listed
- Oak Theatre (1912), 2420 Santa Clara Avenue
- Old Alameda Federal Post Office (1912), 2417 Central Avenue; designated a city of Alameda Historic Monument
- Alameda Theatre (1931), 2315–2323 Central Avenue; Art Moderne building designed by architect Timothy L. Pflueger
Park Street Historic Commercial District's businesses and signage

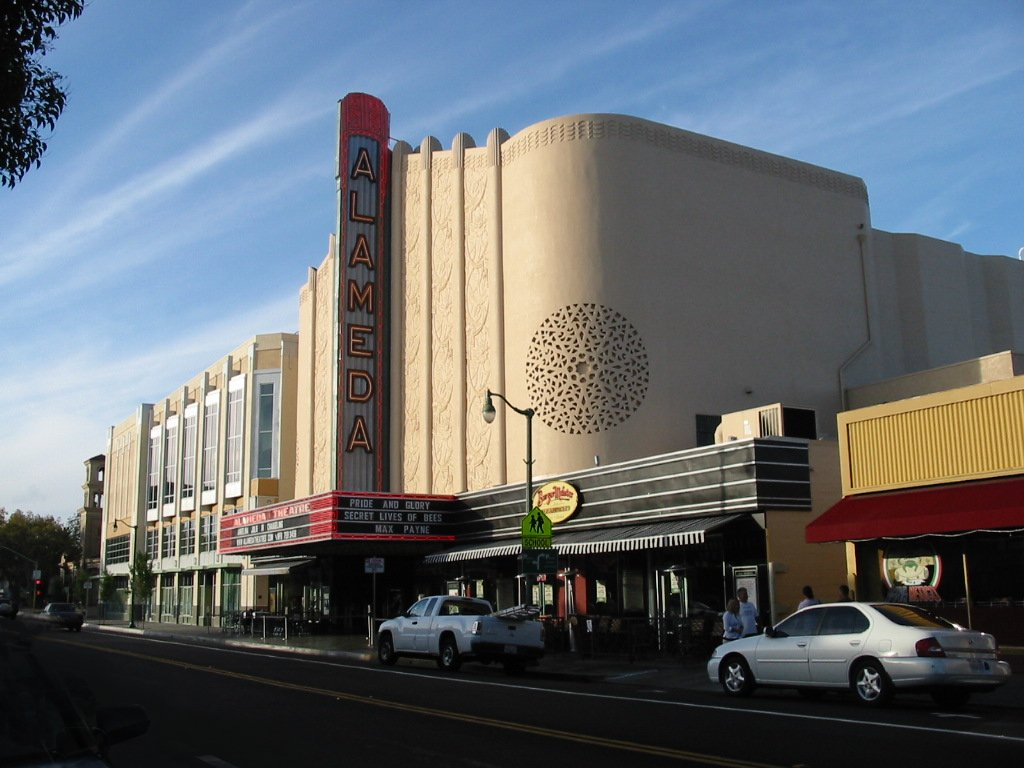
Alameda Theatre, 2317 Central Ave.

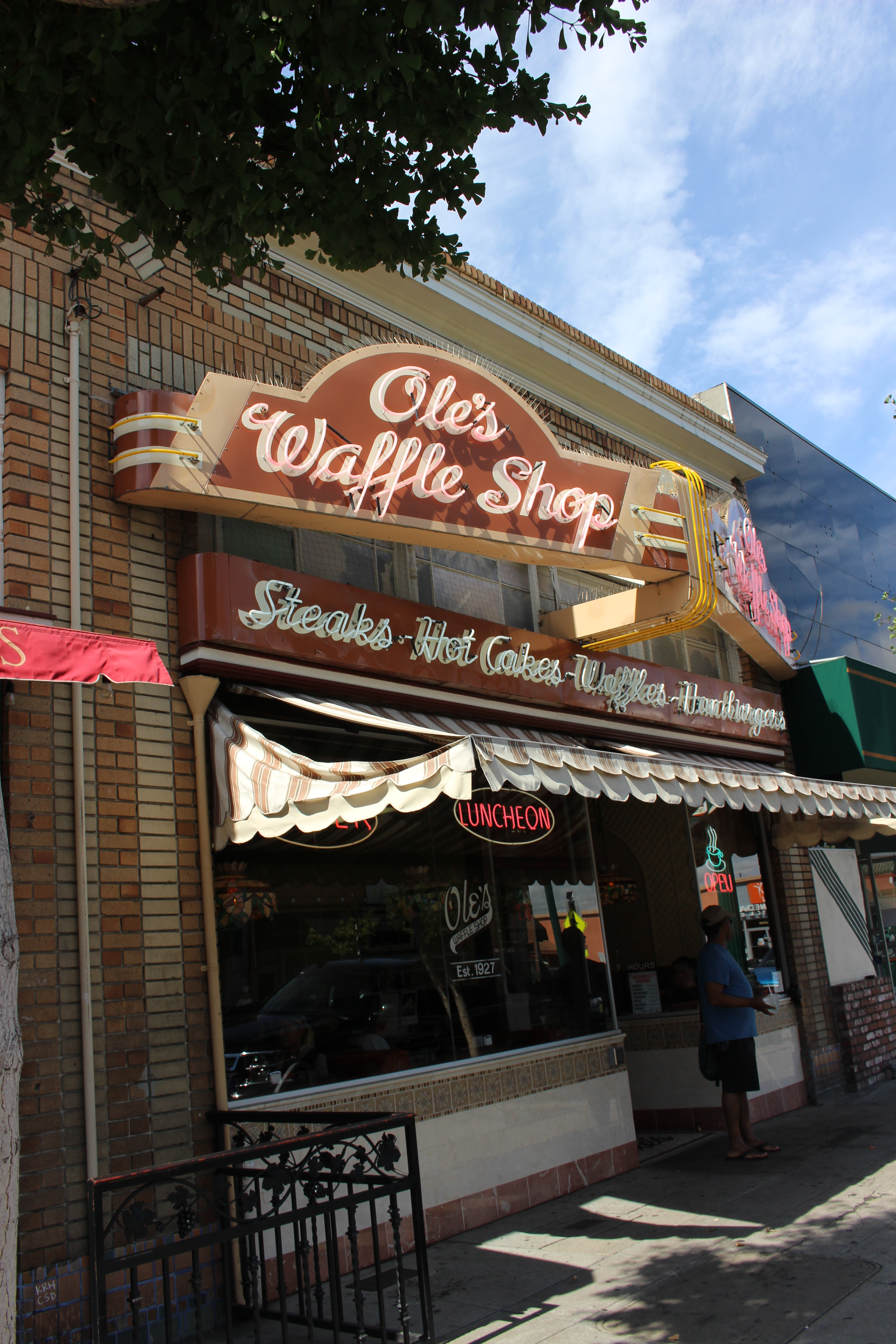
Ole's Waffle Shop, 1507 Park St.

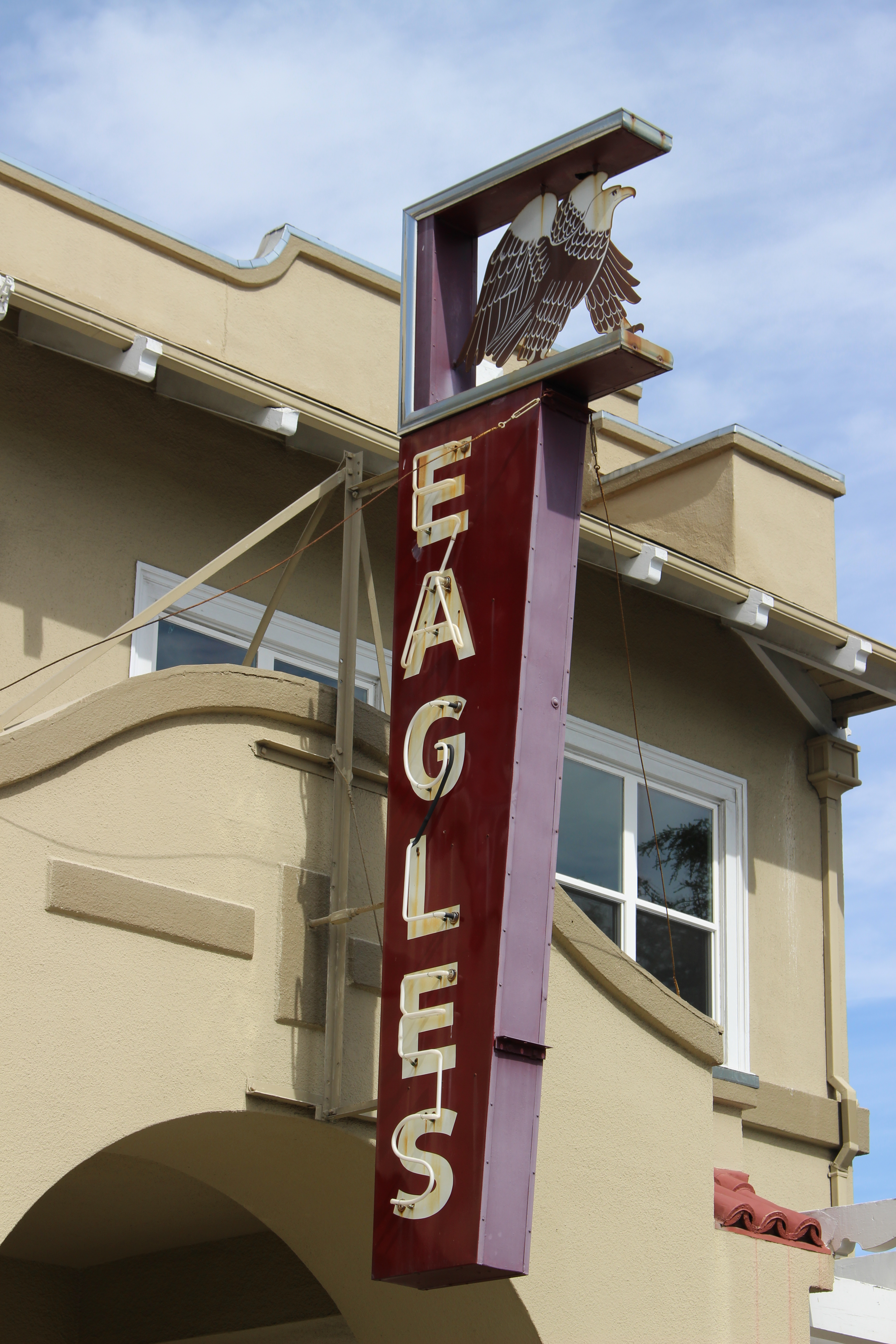
Fraternal Order of Eagles, 2305 Alameda Ave.

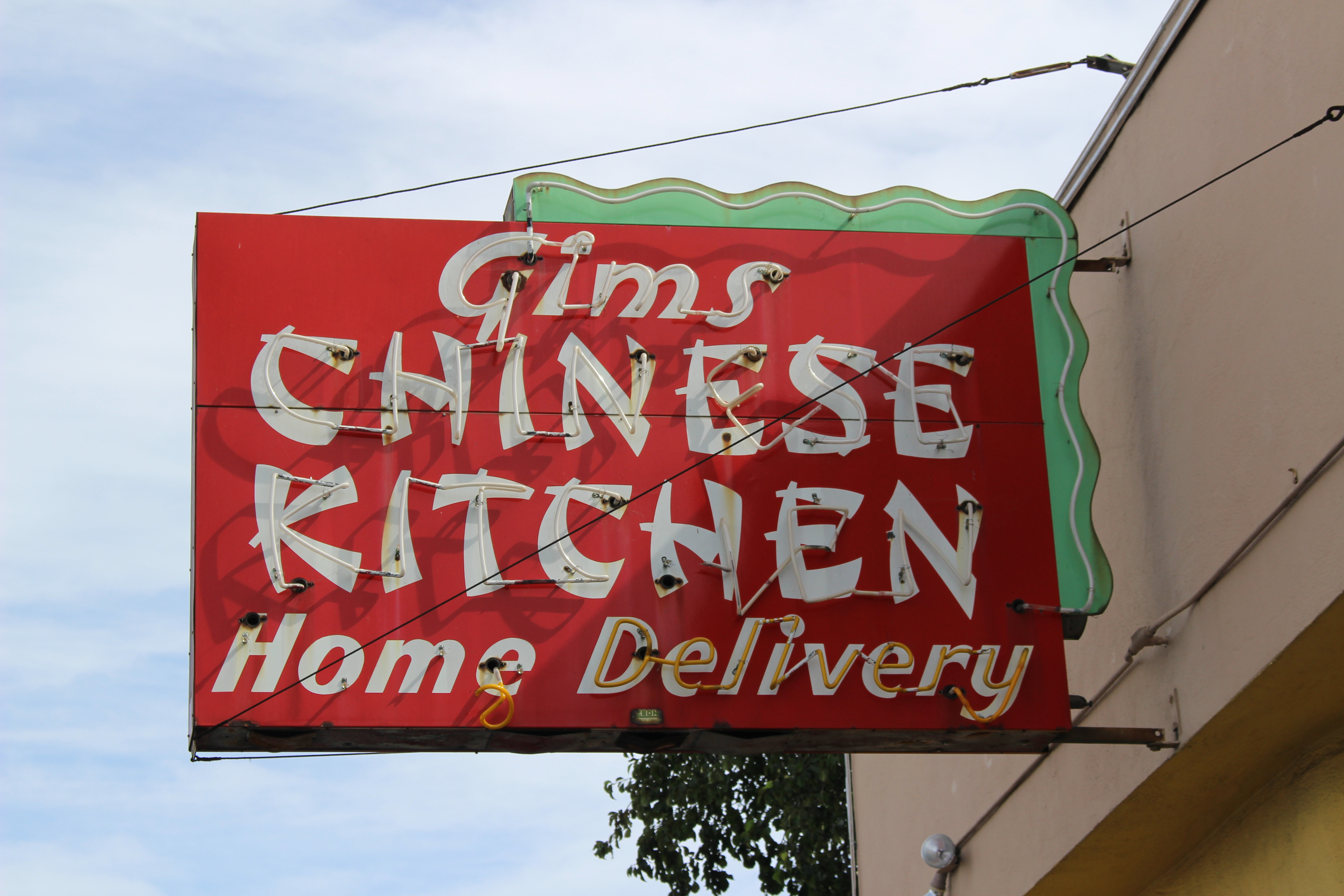
Gims Chinese Kitchen, 2322 Lincoln Ave.

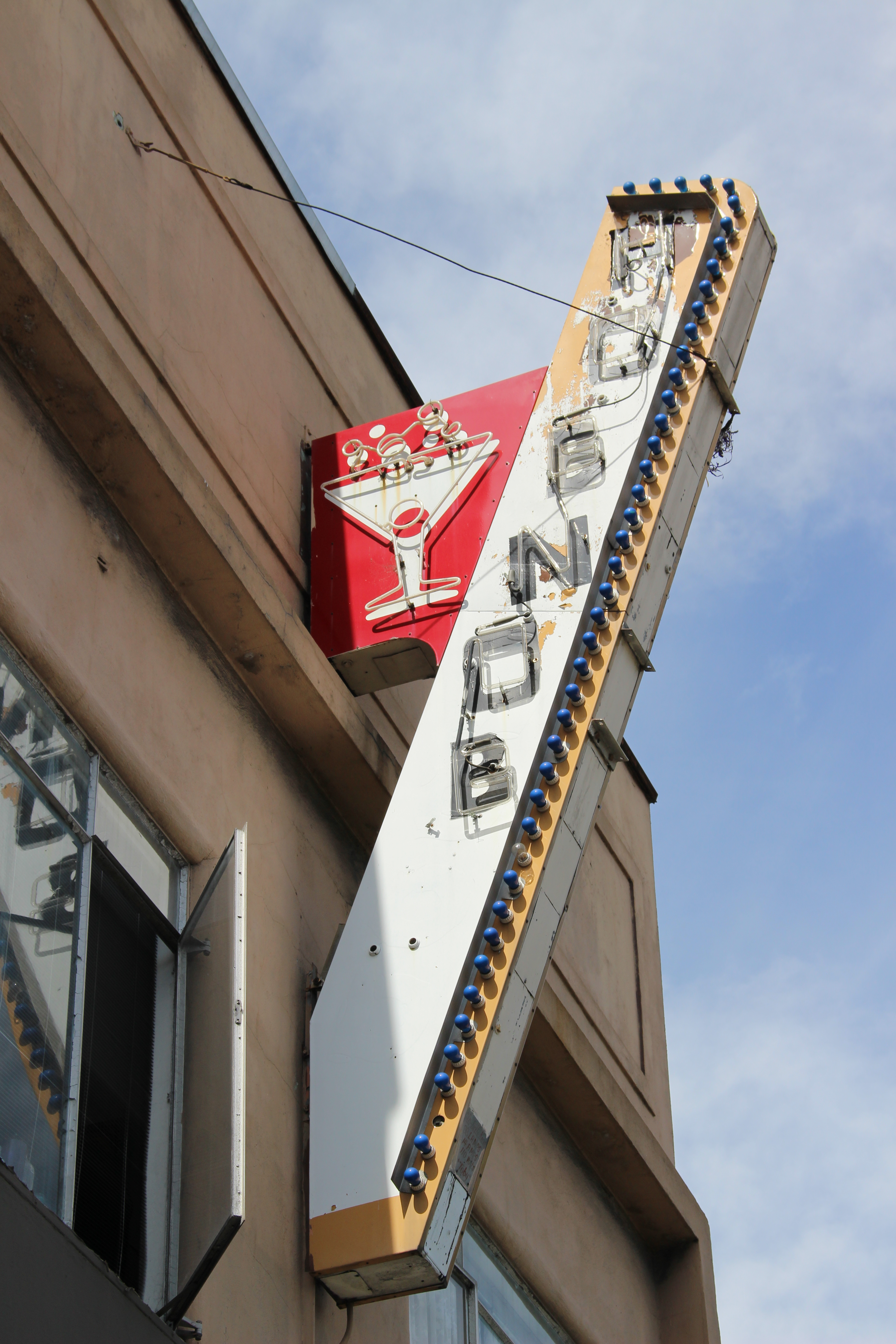
The Hob Nob, 1313 Park St.

== See also ==
- National Register of Historic Places listings in Alameda County, California
