= Alameda Municipal Power =

Utility company in California

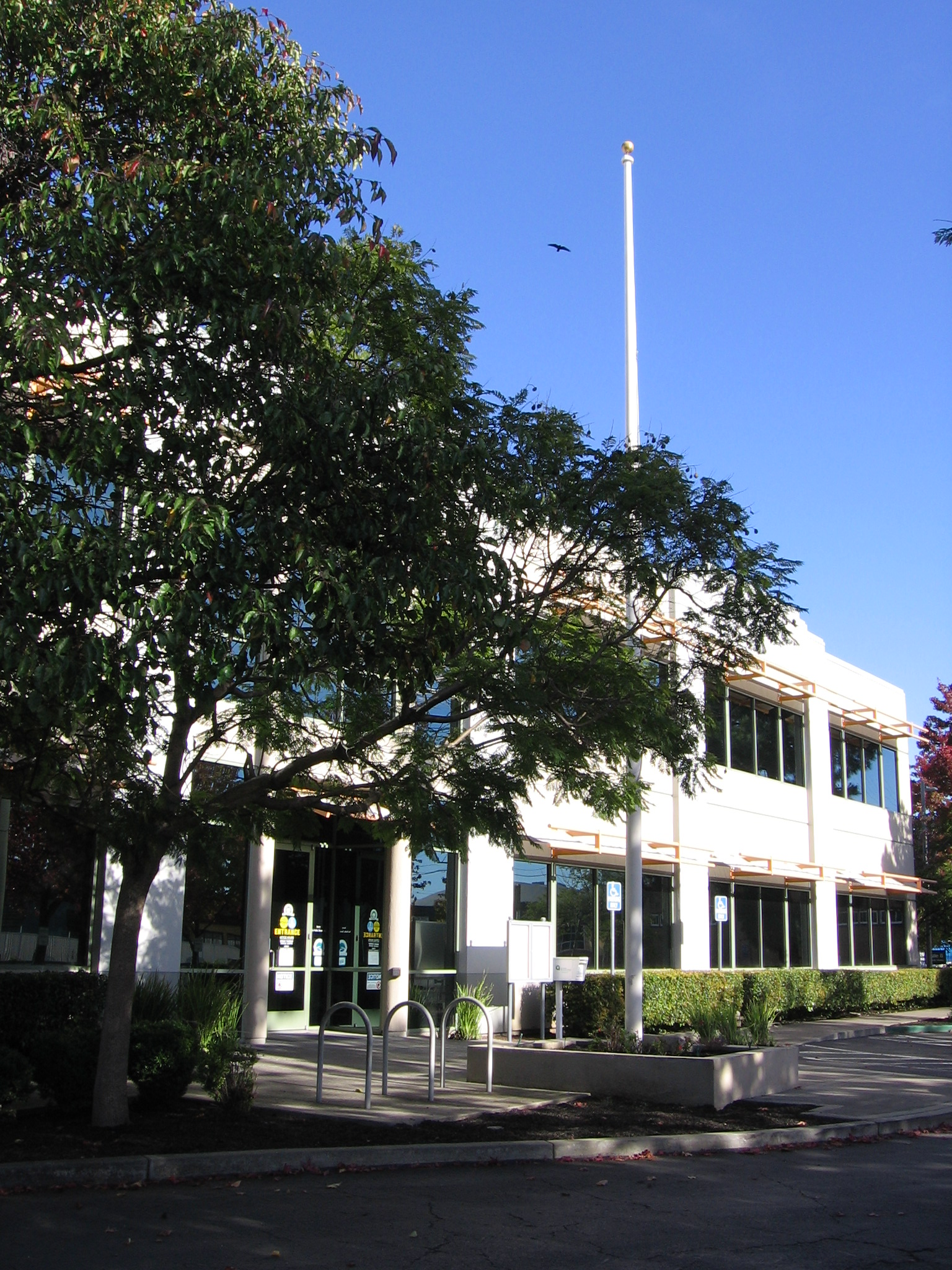
- Headquarters on Grand Street; November 22, 2012
- Industry: Electric utilities
- Founded: July 11, 1887
- Headquarters: Alameda, CA
- Products: electricity
- Website: www.alamedamp.com

Alameda Municipal Power (formerly Alameda Power & Telecom) is a municipal utility serving the City of Alameda, California. Founded in 1887, it provides electricity to c. 34,000 residential, commercial, and municipal customers at rates up to 20 percent below neighboring communities. The first engineer at the plant was HP Nielsen.

As Alameda Power & Telecom, the utility previously provided Cable TV and high-speed Internet services to city residents; their system was acquired by Comcast on November 21, 2008, for $17 million. The estimated net result of this venture was a loss of more than $60 million for the City of Alameda.

During 2014, 22 percent of AMP's power mix came from renewable resources, including biomass (landfill gas) from Pittsburg, Butte, Santa Cruz and Richmond, CA; small hydroelectric from Graeagle and Central Valley CA; and winds from the High Winds Project in Sonoma County, CA. An additional 15 percent of the power mix came from large hydroelectric projects in Calaveras, Shasta, and Central Valley, CA (California does not count power from large hydroelectric dams as renewable). All together, AMP's power is 37% carbon-neutral in 2014.

AMP has been providing 100% clean energy since 2020 and did so in 2023 at approximately a 35% saving over comparable PG&E rates.
