= Ocean dredging =

Technique for ocean bottom sampling

Ocean dredging was an oceanography technique introduced in the nineteenth century and developed by naturalist Edward Forbes. This form of dredging removes substrate and fauna specifically from the marine environment. Ocean dredging techniques were used on the HMS Challenger expeditions as a way to sample marine sediment and organisms.

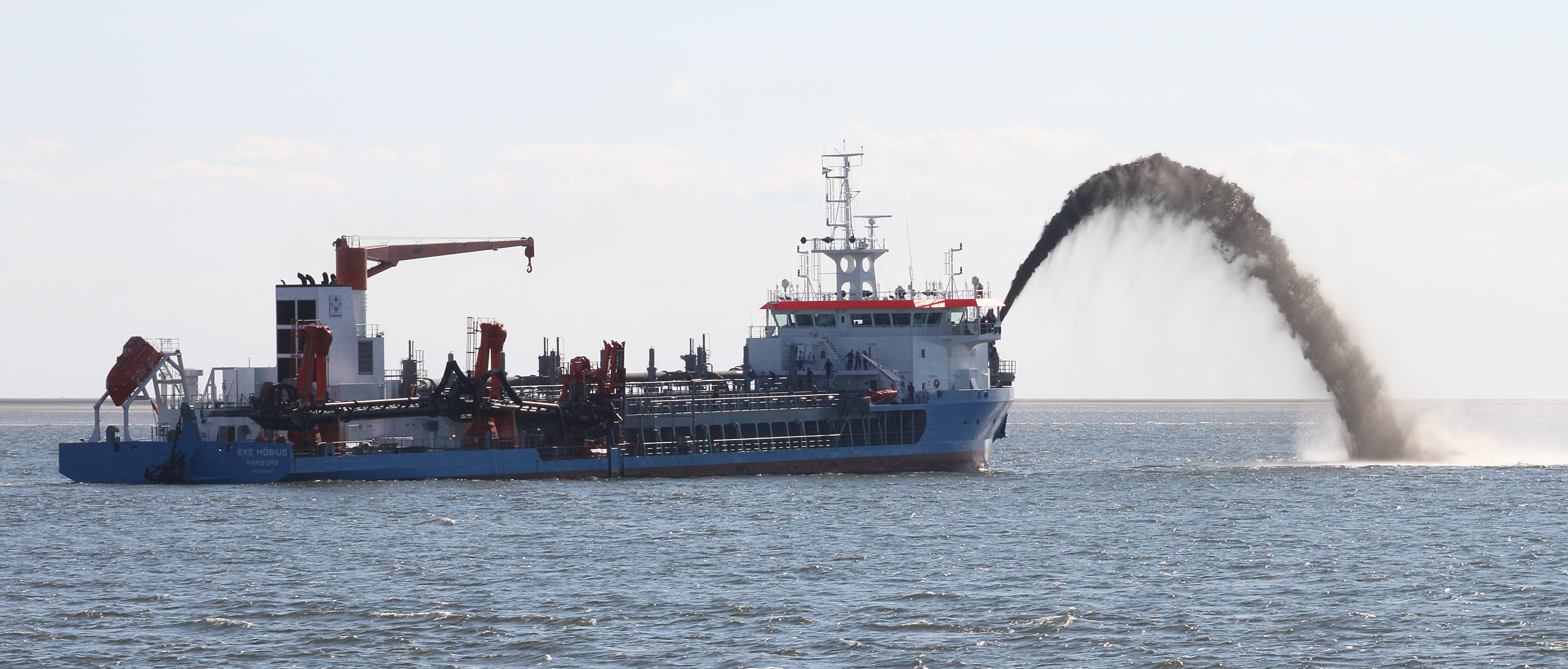
Hopper dredger ship Eke Möbius outside of Cuxhaven, Germany

== History ==
=== Edward Forbes ===
Edward Forbes would lay out the dredged material on the deck to examine, preserve and study it. The practice was chronicled in a remembrance of Forbes by William Jerdan in his 1866 book Men I Have Known.

=== HMS Challenger ===
Ocean dredging was a common sampling technique used on the Challenger expedition. The expedition, led by oceanographer John Murray and chief scientist Charles Wyville Thomson, set sail in 1872 and returned to England in 1876. The ship was equipped with 34 dredges and 20 dredge nets, completing 133 dredges at 111 stations during the 4 year long expedition. Thomson and Murray detail the following instructions for surveying dredged organisms:

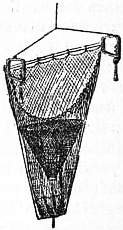
Illustration of a dredge net aboard the HMS Challenger. From Sir Charles Wyville Thomson’s Voyage of the “Challenger.” By permission of Macmillan & Co., Ltd.

"Examine mud brought up by dredge from different depths for living diatoms; examine also for the same purpose the stomachs of Salpae and other marine animals."

The expedition successfully dredged, collected, and preserved marine sediments, plants, algae, and invertebrates. The Challenger expedition is attributed to discovering approximately 4,700 new marine species and expanding the current knowledge of ocean sediments and geology.

== Seafloor effects ==
Ocean dredging can negatively affect benthic ecosystems. When dredging equipment is moved along the seafloor, habitat-forming epifauna is damaged or removed. As emergent corals, sponges, and seagrasses are damaged there is less habitat complexity for juvenile fishes to find protection in. Dredging also removes the sand waves in which juvenile Atlantic cod settle.

The top 2–6 cm of marine substrate is disturbed during dredging, which can have negative impacts on deposit feeders, nutrient flux, and burrowing species. Dredging is often banned or highly restricted within marine protected areas in order to protect recovering ecosystems.

== Equipment used ==
Dredging in the marine environment can be carried out with a variety of equipment, depending on the purpose of the dredge. If the purpose is to remove sand or redistribute sediment, then a dredge drag head attached to a trailing suction hopper dredger ship is used. A fishing dredge (also known as a scallop dredge) is used for collecting edible species of oysters, mussels, scallops, clams, and crabs from the seafloor.

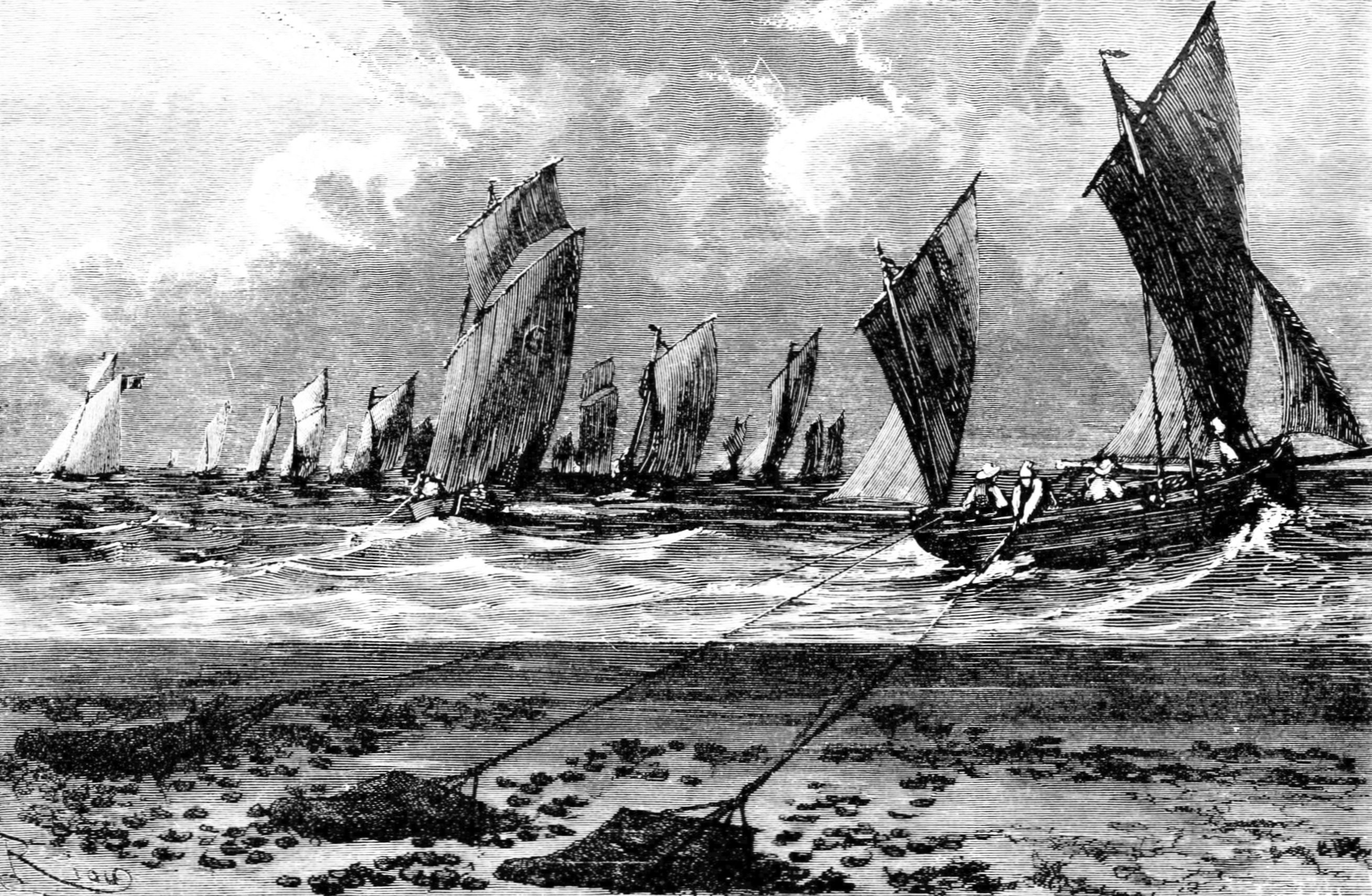
Vessels using fishing dredges to collect scallops (1875).

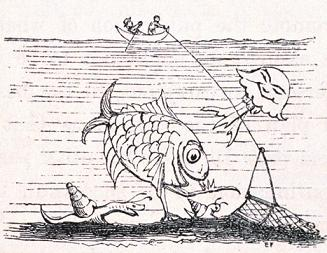
Illustration by naturalist Edward Forbes (edited by Robert Godwin-Austen) for Natural History of the European Seas. The cartoon depicts ocean dredging with a beam trawl.

== See also ==
- Marine sediment
- Terrigenous sediment
- Deep sea mining
- Coastal erosion
- Trawling
