= Mallard II =

Salt pond levee dredger built in 1936

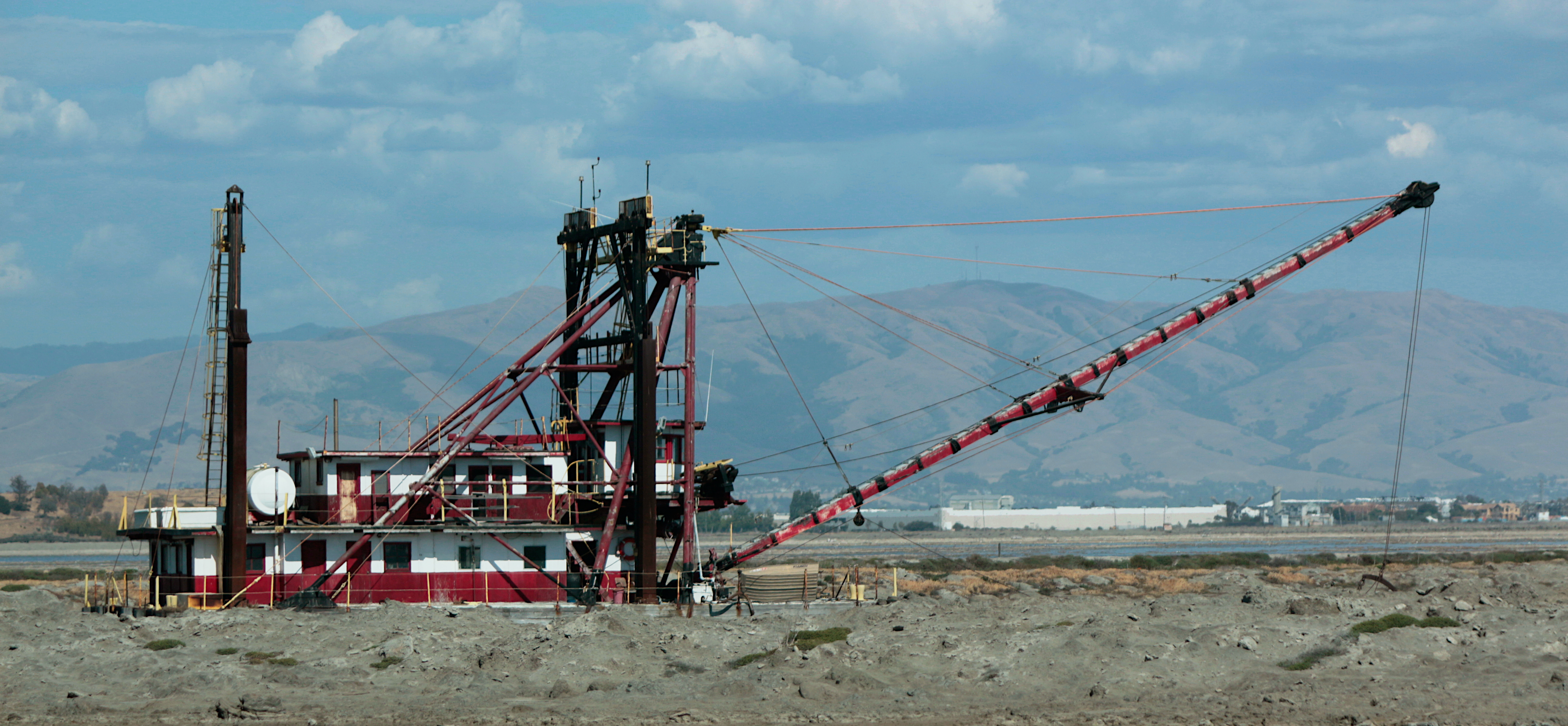
- Mallard II near the Dumbarton Bridge in 2021

History
- Name: Mallard II
- Owner: Cargill Salt
- In service: 1936
- Status: In service
- Notes: Oldest operating dredge in California

General characteristics
- Class & type: Dredger
- Length: 80 ft (24 m)
- Beam: 34 ft (10 m)
- Draft: 7 ft (2.1 m)

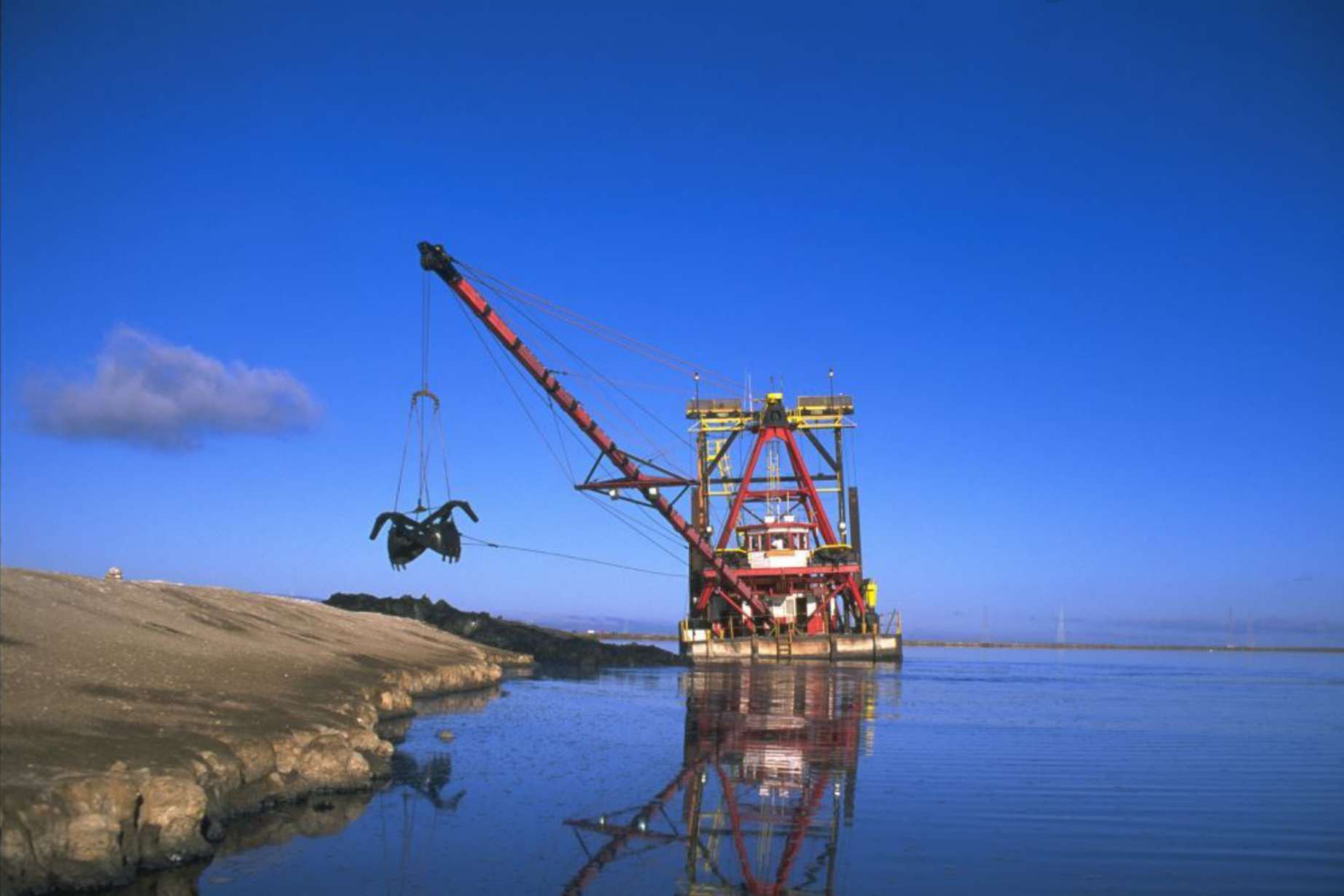
Mallard II moving mud, with its bucket outstretched

Mallard II is a wooden-hulled clamshell dredger used to maintain levees on the San Francisco Bay Salt Ponds. Mallard II was constructed in 1936, and is "probably the oldest operating dredge in California"; she is owned and operated by Cargill Salt.

== History ==
Mallard II was built in 1936, and has maintained the levees of the salt ponds ever since, except for a brief period during World War II during which she was used to retrieve artillery shells from the floor of the Bay near Mare Island and the Port Chicago Naval Magazine. Over time, she received extensive upgrades (including a modern engine, steel A-frame and boom). The steel frame was installed by Bethlehem Pacific's San Francisco shipyard in 1954, at which point she maintained levees on over 30,000 acres (12,000 ha) of ponds in the South Bay as well as Napa County. She has been described as a "floating wood-and-metal dinosaur", with a 2 cu yd (1.5 m^{3}) bucket capable of moving as much as 2,000 cu yd (1,500 m^{3}) of mud per day. While dredging, she is anchored by "spikes", and moves from place to place by "grabbing hold of the sea floor". Mallard II was used to construct such watercourses as North Creek; in 1972 she was briefly idled while the Leslie Salt Company sought dredging permits from the United States Army Corps of Engineers. Salt ponds on which Mallard II is used must be kept at a higher water level than they otherwise would be, owing to her draft.

In 2002, she was used for the Eden Landing wetland restoration project, for which Cargill donated the use of the dredger and 400 man-hours of labor.

As of 2007, she was the only wooden-hulled clamshell dredger operating in San Francisco Bay, as well as "probably the oldest operating dredge in California", responsible for maintaining 200 miles (320 km) of levees between Hayward, Redwood City and San Jose. She repairs and maintains approximately ten miles (16 km) of levee per year. Mallard II can operate for more than two months without being refueled. As of December 2020, she was still operational.

== Levees ==
The levees surrounding the San Francisco Bay Salt Ponds date to the late 1800s, and were mostly constructed to reclaim land for agricultural purposes; the area enclosed by them was later used for salt production. In addition to their role in operating the salt ponds, the levees protect Bay Area cities like San Jose from being flooded by high tides.

Due to factors such as erosion and subsidence, the levees require regular maintenance. Dredging material to increase the levees' height, the "least expensive technique available", consists of moving Mallard II into a salt pond through a set of locks and using her clamshell bucket to remove material from a borrow pit; this material is then deposited atop the levee. When Mallard II is present in a salt pond, waterfowl hunting is not permitted.

A December 2020 permit for a wetlands project issued by the California Department of Fish and Wildlife provided for maintenance of salt ponds to be carried out by the still-operational Mallard II, using the existing system of dredge locks, referred to as "the most technologically and economically feasible method for solar salt production in south San Francisco Bay". While it would be possible to reduce some of the adverse impacts of levee maintenance (mostly caused by the existence of the dredge lock system) by using a "transportable dredge", it was found that such a dredge would require more frequent refueling (every two weeks, as opposed to every two months with Mallard II), as well as the use of large trucks and cranes to reposition it; Mallard II, therefore, was found to be the "most feasible alternative". A 2005 estimate of expenses for levee maintenance in the area put the cost of using Mallard II at approximately $50,000 per month.
