= Dredge plume =

A dredge plume is a cloud of debris that forms as a result of dredging. Such plumes usually begin either at the bottom where the dredging takes place, or at the surface from either overflow from the dredging equipment or dumping of the dredged material in a different location.

A primary reason for dredging is the creation, deepening, or widening of shipping lanes in or near harbors, especially those that service large ships. Such work, however, is often subject to governmental regulation, one element of which concerns the effects dredge plumes might have on the surrounding environment. At least two groups have a stake in dredge plumes: governments and dredging companies. Determining the effects of dredge plumes requires understanding their dynamics and interaction with the area's biodiversity.

As an example, imagine dredging using a clamshell dredger, which deposits the dredged material on a barge that takes its load to a separate area and dumps it overboard. In this scenario, a dredge plume can be expected to begin at the bottom as the clamshell bucket stirs up loose material and sediment. As it rises through the water column to the surface, any material not fully contained by the bucket also creates a plume. At the dumping site, a dredge plume begins at the surface as the material enters the water column from above.

Once begun, a dredge plume develops and dissipates. These processes depend on a number of factors—such as the rate at which dredgers release material into the water column, and exactly where they release it. Another factor is the types of dredged materials. A dredge plume of coarse sand has different properties and dynamics than a similar plume of fine sand. Dredge plumes usually contain different constituents, each of which affects the plume's character. For example, denser material settles faster than less dense material. A fourth factor is the degree to which the plume's material clumps together to form larger particles, a process known as flocculation. Still another factor is water movement where the plume is introduced, e.g., currents, tides, waves, and turbulence.

Dredge plume evolution—how large it becomes, where it moves, how long it lasts, where its constituent materials settle—can be modeled, albeit imperfectly. Examples of such models include DREDGEMAP, the MMS Dredge Plume Model and the Delft3D Suite. The result of years of research and engineering, such models are important tools to help determine if the expected effects of proposed dredging are within acceptable governmental limits.

A plume's evolution determines its effects on marine plants and animals. For example, the total suspended solids in the plume affects the amount of light that can pass through it, and this may harm marine life, which needs a certain amount of light to thrive. Similarly, the plume's constituents can alter the water column's salinity or oxygen content—and these changes can harm certain organisms. Also, should the plume's constituents settle in places ill-suited to their presence, e.g., where fish would normally lay their eggs, a necessary element of an ecosystem may be disrupted.
