= Dredge ball joint =

A dredge ball joint is a connection between two pipes that are used to transport a mixture of water and sand from a dredger to the discharging area.

== Dredge ball joint components ==
- Gland
- Ball
- Liner
- Case

=== Additional parts of a dredge ball joint ===
- Case liner
- Ball liner
- Gland liner

== Dredge ball joint design ==
The inner diameter of dredge ball joint pipes ranges from 400 mm to 1200 mm. Dredge ball joint liners can be produced from steel and hard iron materials. To allow for variations of the tilting angle, the ball turning angle of a dredge ball joint is 15 degrees to 18 degrees, and the discharge pipe variation for a dredge ball joint ranges from 10 mm to 30 mm. The dredge ball joints are made to operate at low, medium and high pressure.

=== Dredge ball joint materials ===
Dredge ball joints can be made from Cast iron of a manganese, chromium, nickel and molybdenum alloy, ductile manganese iron, or hard chromium iron.
