= MV Tian Kun Hao =

Chinese dredger

MV Tian Kun Hao (天鯤) is a Chinese dredger that has been described variously as “Asia’s most powerful island maker” and "magic island maker" due to its capability to dig 6,000 cubic metres per hour of sand/silt. The ship was launched at Qidong in Jiangsu province in November 2017. The ship is apparently named after "a legendary enormous fish which can turn into a mythical bird".

== Design ==
- Length = 140m
- Beam width = 28m
- Designer = Tianjin Dredging Co., a subsidiary of the China Communications Construction Company
- Dredging depth = 35m
- Discharge distance = 15 km

== Purpose ==
Various sources have speculated that the ship will be used for island building in the area of the South China Sea claimed by China and for possible use in areas of territorial disputes with countries including Japan, Vietnam, and the Philippines.

== See also ==
- Territorial disputes in the South China Sea
