= Dredge drag head =

Steel structure connected to a dredger by a suction pipe

A dredge drag head is used by a trailing suction hopper dredger to collect sand from the sea floor.

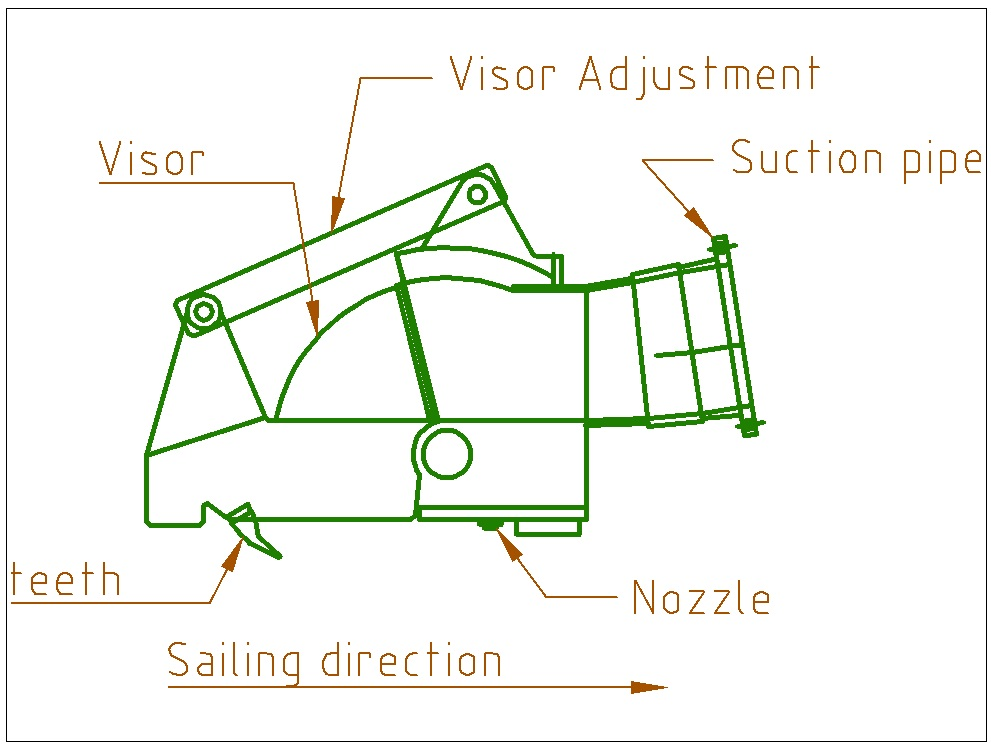
Dredge drag head

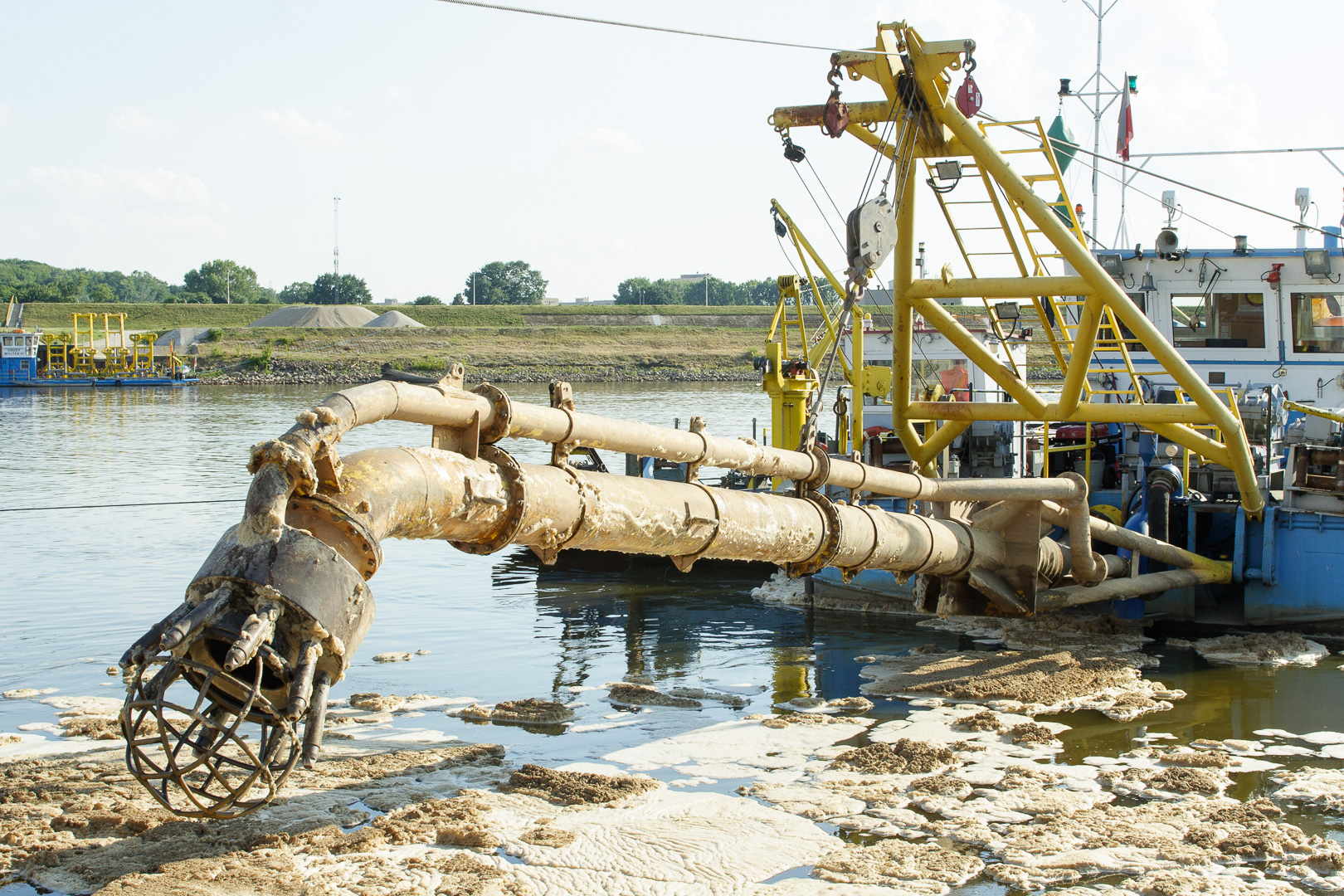
The dredge drag head of a suction dredge barge on the Vistula River, Warsaw, Poland

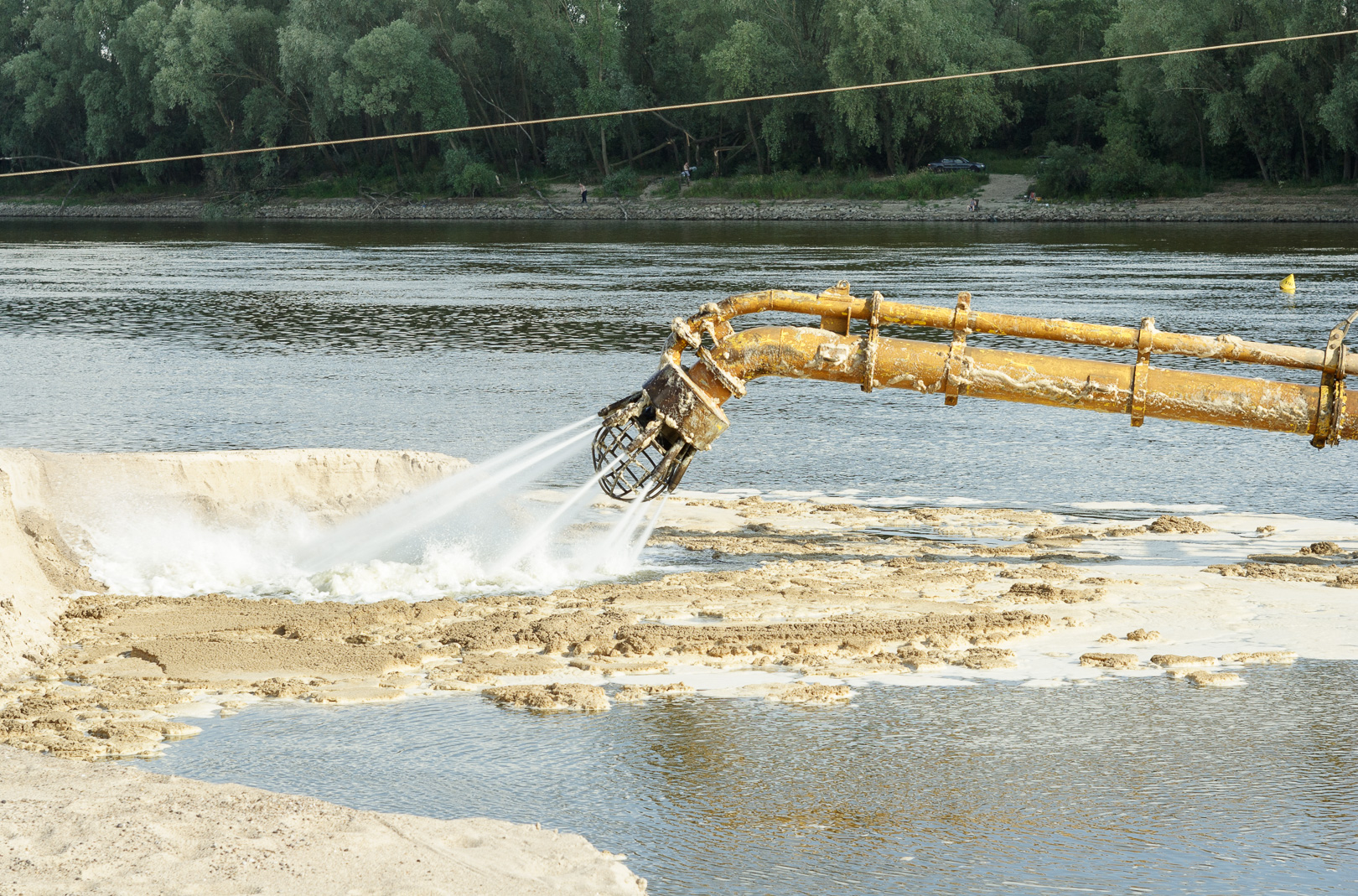
The same dredge drag head and the suction pipe.

The dredge drag head is a steel structure that is connected to the dredger by a suction pipe. Supported by the gantries and by using hydraulic winches the dredge drag head and suction pipe are let down onto the sea bottom in order to suck a mixture of water and sand.

In order to dredge in waves, the suction pipe is suspended from special davits, which operate with heave compensation to ensure that the drag head nozzles stay in contact with the sea bed. The control of mixture of water and sand is done by a so-called dredge drag head visor. The visor controls the amount of water that enters along with the sand. In some cases this visor is hydraulically controlled.

To cut the sea bed, the dredge drag head is equipped with replaceable teeth and water jet nozzles. The nozzles are placed at the front of the dredge drag head and used to cut the sand at the sea bed vertically, while the replaceable teeth are placed at the back to cut horizontally.
