= Essayons =

French language phrase

Essayons is a French word meaning "let us try." It is the motto of the United States Army Corps of Engineers, and was also used as the name of at least four of their ships:

- Essayons (1868 ship)
- Essayons (1908 tugboat)
- USAV Essayons (1949 ship)
- USAV Essayons (1982 ship)
