= USAV Essayons (1982 ship) =

US Army dredge

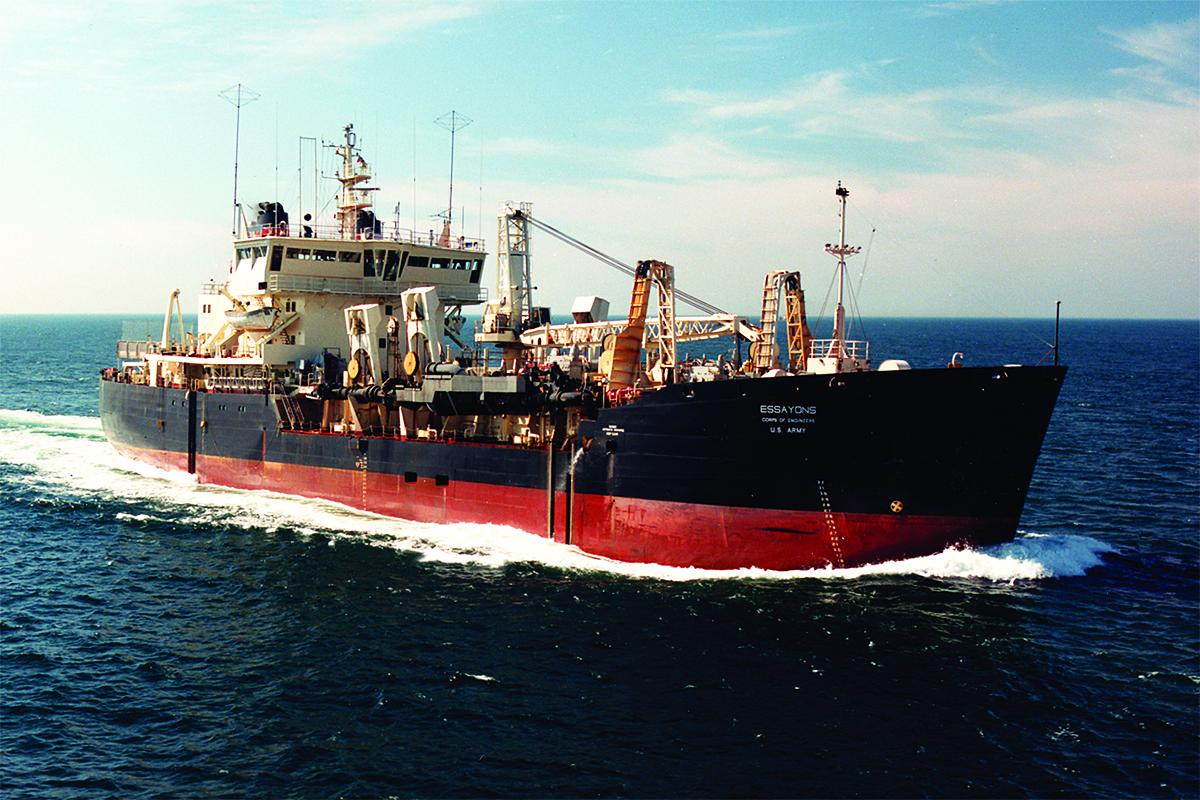
- USAV Essayons

History

United States
- Builder: Bath Iron Works
- Laid down: May 18, 1981
- Launched: April 23, 1982
- Commissioned: September 22, 1983
- Identification: MMSI number: 366972000; IMO number: 7923495; Call Sign: AENO

General characteristics
- Class & type: Hopper drege
- Displacement: 7,248 Long tons
- Length: 350 ft (110 m)
- Beam: 68 ft (21 m)
- Draft: 18.5 feet (5.6 m)
- Propulsion: 2 x Caterpillar C-280 12 Diesel engines
- Speed: 13.8 kn (25.6 km/h; 15.9 mph) maximum
- Range: 7,500 Nautical miles
- Capacity: 9,500 long tons (9,652 t) deadweight
- Complement: 2 alternating tours of 23 civilian mariners

USAV Essayons is a hopper dredge of the United States Army Corps of Engineers. Her primary mission is to maintain the entrance bars, rivers, and harbors along the coasts of Alaska, Hawaii, California, Oregon, and Washington. In emergencies, she can also be deployed to the Mississippi River. She is assigned to the Portland District of the Army Corps of Engineers. Her homeport is Portland, Oregon. She was launched in 1982 and remains in service.

== Construction and characteristics ==
Essayons was designed by the Marine Design Division of the Army Corps of Engineers. Sun Shipbuilding & Drydock Company, of Chester, Pennsylvania won the bid to build the ship, but found itself unable to perform because of capacity constraints in its shipyard. Instead, it subcontracted the work to Bath Iron Works which built Essaysons at its Bath, Maine shipyard. The contract with Bath Iron Works was reportedly for $30 million. Her total initial cost, including the work at Bath, was reportedly $75 million. She was launched on April 23, 1982. Lieutenant General Joseph Bratton, Chief of Engineers of the United States Army, was the keynote speaker at the ceremony. The ship was christened by Louise Bratton, the general's wife. After sea trials, Essayons was commissioned on September 22, 1983.

The ship was originally intended for the Philadelphia District of the Corps of Engineers but was assigned to the Portland District instead. There, Essayons replaced USAV Biddle, which was decommissioned. The reassignment of the Corps' newest dredge may have been the result of pressure applied by Senator Mark Hatfield of Oregon, who sought additional dredging in the Columbia River. Philadelphia was assigned USAV McFarland instead of Essayons.

Essayons is 350 feet (110 m) long and has a beam of 68 feet (21 m). Her hull is constructed of welded steel plates, and includes a double-bottom. Her mean draft is 18.5 feet (5.6 m), but she draws 32 feet (9.8 m) when her hopper is loaded with dredging spoil. She displaces 7,248 long tons. Her hull contains 12 bays or hoppers which can hold up to 6,243 cubic yards of dredging spoil.

Essaysons is propelled by two four-bladed propellers driven by two Tier II Caterpillar C-280 12 Diesel engines which develop 4,640 horsepower each. These replaced the original General Motors 20-645-E7 engines during a refit in the winter of 2008–2009. The ship is capable of speeds up to 13.8 knots (15.9 mph) when lightly loaded, and 13.2 knots (15.2 mph) with her hopper full. There are seven electrical generators aboard. There are three 600 volt generators driven by Tier II Caterpillar C-280 12 Diesel engines which produce 3,250 Kw each. These power the dredge pumps and bow thruster. There are three 480 volt generators driven by Tier II Caterpillar 3512C Diesel engines which produce 1,030 kW each. These provide electrical power to the ship and the dredging hydraulics. There is one 480 volt emergency generator driven by a Tier II Caterpillar C18 Diesel engine which produces 425 kW. Essayons has a 1,000 horsepower bow thruster to improve maneuverability.

The ship is crewed by 46 civilian mariners. These are broken into two tours of 23 men and women who alternate running Essayons. The crews normally work for 8 days and then take 6 days off. Crew members work 10-hour shifts, allowing the ship to operate around the clock.

The ship has a helipad on its aft deck. There are a number of amenities aboard for the crew including a cook and fully galley for meal service, a weight room, sauna, and laundry facilities.

Essayons is at least the fourth vessel of that name to serve with the Army Corps of Engineers. "Essayons" is the motto of the Army Corps of Engineers. It is a French word which means "Let us try". The previous Essayons was a hopper dredge commissioned on January 16, 1950, and retired in May, 1980. The name was given to a Corps of Engineers tug, which was built in 1908 and retired in 1949. A yet earlier vessel, a "dredge-boat" named Essayons, was built for the Army Corps of Engineers in 1868. She was used to keep the mouth of the Mississippi River clear.

== Operating history ==
=== Dredging operations ===
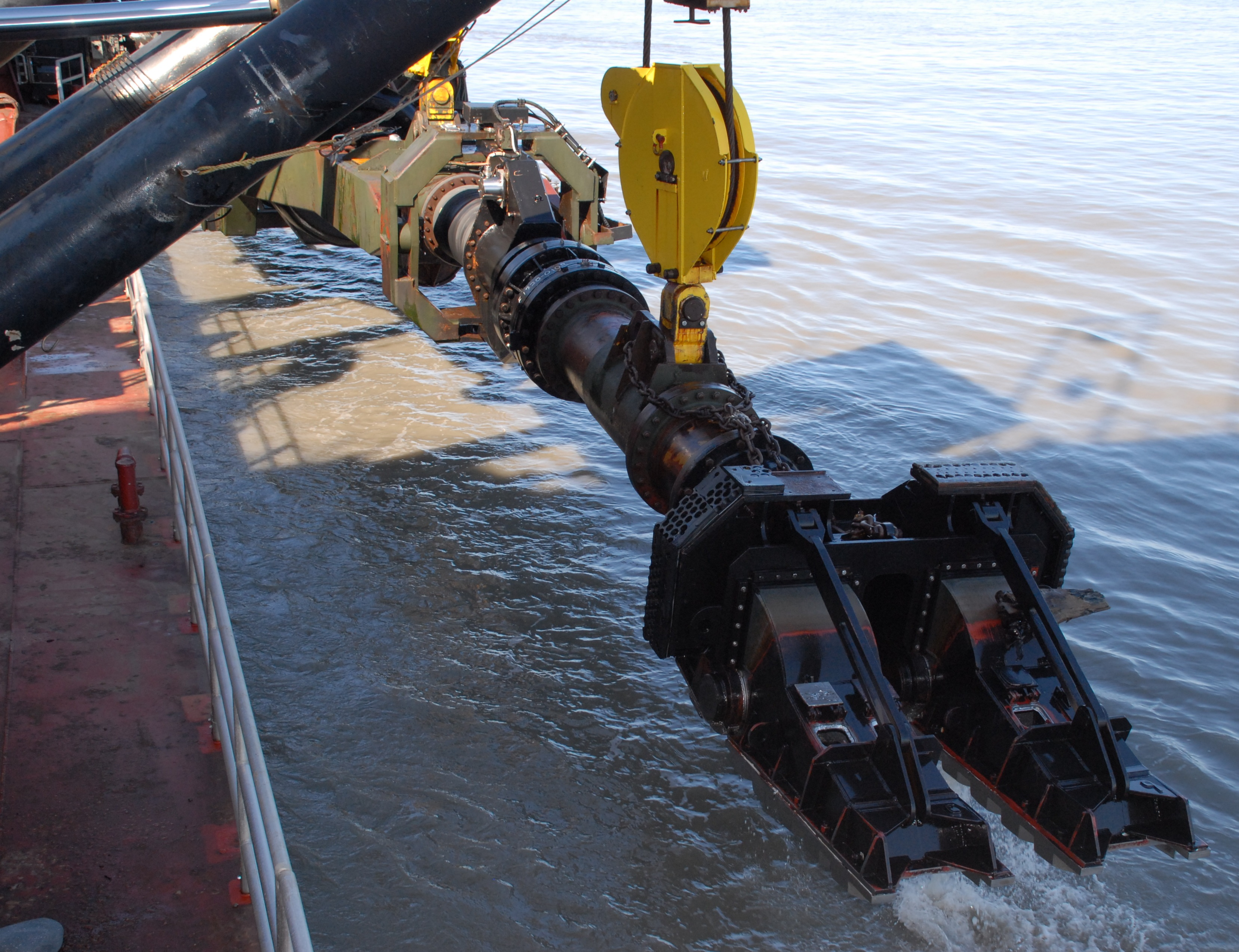
Starboard drag head and drag arm on USAV Essayons

Essayons sucks sand, silt, and mud off the bottom of navigable waterways to increase their depth, creating a channel allowing larger ships to pass. She pulls two suction heads, referred to as "drag heads", along the seafloor as she moves slowly through the water. The drag heads are connected to pipes which are 28 inches (71 cm) in diameter called "drag arms" that descend from both sides of the ship. These drag arms are controlled by two winches each which can lower them to reach bottom as deep as 94 feet (29 m). Loose material on the seafloor enters the drag heads and is pulled up through the drag arms by powerful pumps. It is then deposited in a hopper in the middle of the ship. The ship reaches capacity after about 45 minutes to an hour of dredging. When the hopper is full, the ship sails to an offshore location and opens doors in the bottom of the hopper, allowing the dredge spoil to fall to the sea bottom.

Stormy winter weather makes work in the entrance bars to many harbors too dangerous, so the dredging season is roughly March to November. During the winter pause in dredging operations, Essayons visits a shipyard for maintenance. For example, during the winter of 2019 - 2020, the ship was dry-docked for maintenance at the Vigor Industrial shipyard in Portland.

The Corps of Engineers does not budget for the operation of Essayons directly. Instead, project funding to dredge specific ports flows to the ship when she does a particular job. The majority of this project funding comes from the Corps of Engineers budget, but a port, city, state or some other entity contributes to the cost of dredging. In FY 2013 the daily rate for Essayons dredging services was $113,000.

Essayons is the largest hopper dredge in the Corps of Engineers fleet on the West Coast, and thus is often employed in the largest ports. Over the course of her career she has dredged channels in the following waterways, in many cases several times:

==== Alaska ====
- Anchorage

==== Hawaii ====
- Kahului
- Hilo
- Honolulu
- Nawiliwili
- Pearl Harbor

==== Washington ====
- Gray's Harbor

==== Oregon ====
- Columbia River
- Coos Bay
- Willamette River

==== California ====
- Humbolt Bay
- Los Angeles Harbor
- Oakland
- Richmond
- San Francisco Bay

==== Louisiana ====
- Mississippi Delta

=== Exxon Valdez response ===
On March 24, 1989, the Exxon Valdez ran aground in Prince William Sound, Alaska creating one of the largest oil spills in American history. On April 13, 1989 Essayons was ordered to Astoria, Oregon to prepare to assist in the spill response. There she took on fuel and supplies, oil boom, a small oil-skimming vessel and crew to run it, pumps, hoses, oil absorbing pads, chemicals, and fire-control equipment. She left Astoria on April 17, 1989, and arrived in Prince William Sound on April 21, 1989.

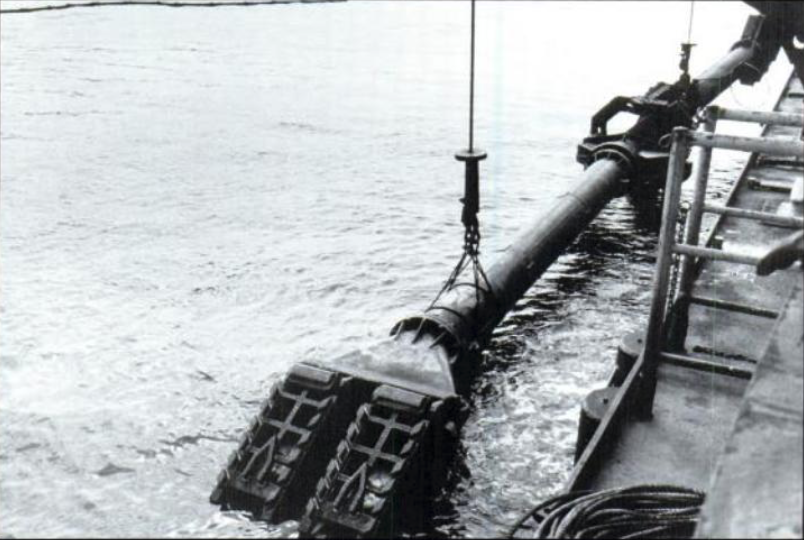
Inverted drag head used for oil recovery on USAV Yaquina

Suction dredges are not designed for oil recovery, so it was unclear if they would be effective in this role. USAV Yaquina arrived on scene before Essayons and began experimenting. With her drag heads in their usual position, she sucked up more water than oil. This led to inverting her drag heads so that oil was sucked down from the surface. Within 15 minutes of the first trial of this new method, Yaquina pumped aboard 63,000 gallons of oil sludge. This innovation was passed to Essayons by radio, and it proved effective. Essayons began her skimming operations around Gore Rock and worked her way as way north as Resurrection Bay and as far south as Sutwik Island in Shelikof Strait. She combined with USAV Yaquina to recover 379,720 gallons of oil.

By the end of May, 1989 most of the oil had dispersed or washed ashore, so Essayons was unable to skim meaningful amounts from the sea. Instead, her massive hopper was used to collect oiled sand and other beach debris dug up by workers on shore. The Corps of Engineers objected to this use and the ship was released from the spill response effort. She was a mess. The oil and sand in her hopper had solidified into an asphalt-like consistency. This gunk incorporated rotting carcasses of various animals that had died in the spill and the combination was emitting poisonous gasses. It took a month and a half of cleaning at Seward before she could sail back to Portland. She departed Alaskan waters on July 19, 1989, and arrived back in Portland on July 24.

The total cost of Essayon's response to the oil spill was $1,111,732 which, after some contention, was reimbursed by Exxon.

=== Other duties ===
Essayons has taken aboard cadets from maritime academies seeking to earn sea-time credit during their Summer break. In summer 1989, for example, the regimental commander of the Massachusetts Maritime Academy served aboard the ship.
