= USAV Yaquina =

US Army dredge

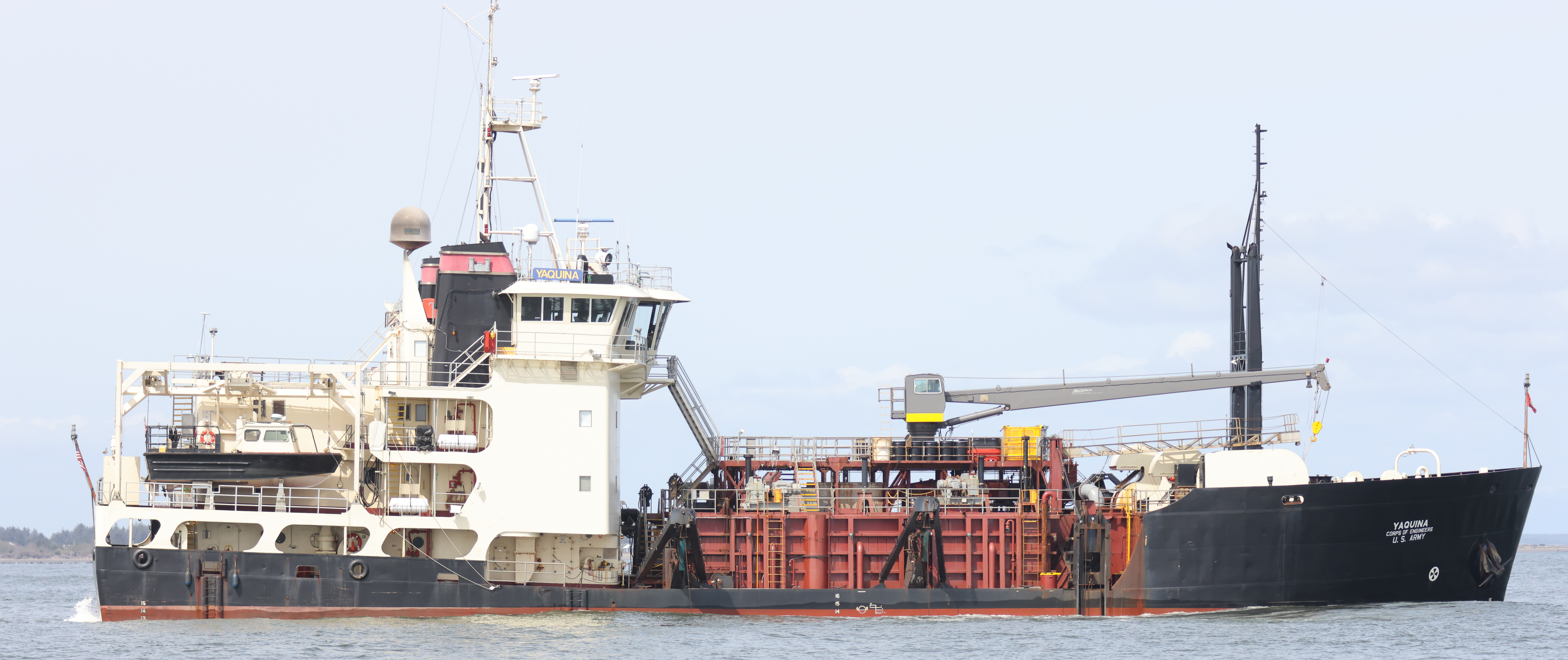
- USAV Yaquina

History

United States
- Builder: Norfolk Shipbuilding and Drydock Corporation
- Cost: $13,985,700
- Launched: August 23, 1980
- Commissioned: June 12, 1981
- Identification: MMSI number: 366971000; IMO number: 7923445; Call Sign: AEPD

General characteristics
- Class & type: Hopper Dredge
- Tonnage: 2,001 GT
- Length: 200 ft (61 m)
- Beam: 58 ft (18 m)
- Draft: 12 feet (3.7 m)
- Propulsion: 2 MTU 8V 4000 M60 Diesel engines
- Speed: 10.5 kn (19.4 km/h; 12.1 mph) maximum
- Complement: 2 alternating tours of 20 civilian mariners

USAV Yaquina is a hopper dredge of the United States Army Corps of Engineers. Her primary mission is to maintain the entrance bars, rivers, and harbors along the coasts of California, Oregon, and Washington. She is assigned to the Portland District of the Army Corps of Engineers. Her homeport is Portland, Oregon. She was launched in 1980 and remains in service.

== Construction and characteristics ==
In October 1977 the Army Corps of Engineers invited bids for a new hopper dredge of its own design. Bids were opened on December 15, 1977. Norfolk Shipbuilding and Drydock Corporation won the bid to build Yaquina at its Norfolk, Virginia shipyard. The initial contract price was $13,985,700. She was the first new dredge built by the United States government in 13 years. Congress placed a moratorium on new dredges in 1967 seeking to provide opportunities for private dredging companies. Yaquina was launched on August 23, 1980. The ship was christened by Geraldine Morris, the wife of Lieutenant General John W. Morris, Chief of Engineers of the U.S. Army, who gave the keynote address at the ceremony. She was commissioned at a ceremony at Newport, Oregon on June 12, 1981. The keynote speaker at her commissioning was Senator Mark Hatfield.

Yaquina is 200 feet (61 m) long and has a beam of 58 feet (18 m). Her hull is constructed of welded steel plates. Her mean draft is 9 feet (2.7 m), but she draws 16 feet (4.9 m) when her hopper is loaded with dredging spoil. Her gross tonnage is 2,001. Her hopper can hold up to 1,042 cubic yards of dredging spoil.

Yaquina is propelled by two four-bladed Hundested MP700 propellers driven by two Tier 2 MTU 8V 4000 M60 Diesel engines which develop 1,140 horsepower each. These MTU engines replaced the original Caterpillar 16-cylinder D399 Diesel engines during a refit in the winter of 2010-2011. The ship is capable of speeds up to 10.5 knots (12.1 mph) when lightly loaded, and 10 knots (12 mph) with her hopper full. Electrical power is provided by two Tier II MTU 12V 2000 P82 Diesel generators which produce 440 Kw each. The dredge pumps are powered by two Tier II MTU 12V 2000 P12 Diesel engines which produce 805 horsepower each. She has a bow thruster to improve maneuverability, which is powered by a Tier II MTU Series 60 Diesel engine which generates 425 horsepower.

The ship is crewed by 40 civilian mariners. These are broken into two tours of 20 men and women who alternate running Yaquina. The crews normally work for 8 days and then take 6 days off. Crew members work 10-hour shifts, allowing the ship to operate around the clock. Each crew member has a private room. The ship has a galley and cook to provide meals, an exercise room, and laundry facilities.

== Operating history ==
=== Dredging operations ===
Yaquina sucks sand, silt, and mud off the bottom of navigable waterways to increase their depth, creating a channel allowing larger ships to pass. She pulls two suctionheads, referred to as "dragheads", along the seafloor as she moves slowly through the water. The dragheads are connected to pipes which are 20 inches (51 cm) in diameter called "drag arms" that descend from both sides of the ship. These drag arms are controlled by three winches each which can lower them to reach bottom as deep as 55 feet (17 m). Loose material on the seafloor enters the dragheads and is pulled up through the drag arms by powerful pumps. It is then deposited in a hopper in the middle of the ship. When the hopper is full, the ship sails to an offshore location and opens doors in the bottom of the hopper, allowing the dredge spoil to fall to the sea bottom. It typically takes 35 minutes of dredging to fill the ship's hopper to capacity.

Stormy winter weather makes work in the entrance bars to many harbors too dangerous, so the dredging season is roughly March to November. During the winter pause in dredging operations, Yaquina visits a shipyard for maintenance. For example, in December 2020 the ship was serviced at Vigor Industrial's facilities in Seattle.

When she was placed in service, the Army Corps of Engineers budgeted for the entire cost of operating Yaquina. Channels were dredged at no cost to the ports or the ships that used them. This policy changed in 1983. After that date, Yaquina typically only dredged where a port, city, state or some other entity was willing to pay for at least part of the cost of operating the ship. In 1991 this cost was $30,000 per day. By FY 2013 the daily rate had risen to $85,000 per day.

Yaquina is the smallest hopper dredge in the Corps of Engineers fleet, and thus is often employed in the smallest ports. Over the course of her career she has dredged channels in the following waterways, in many cases several times:

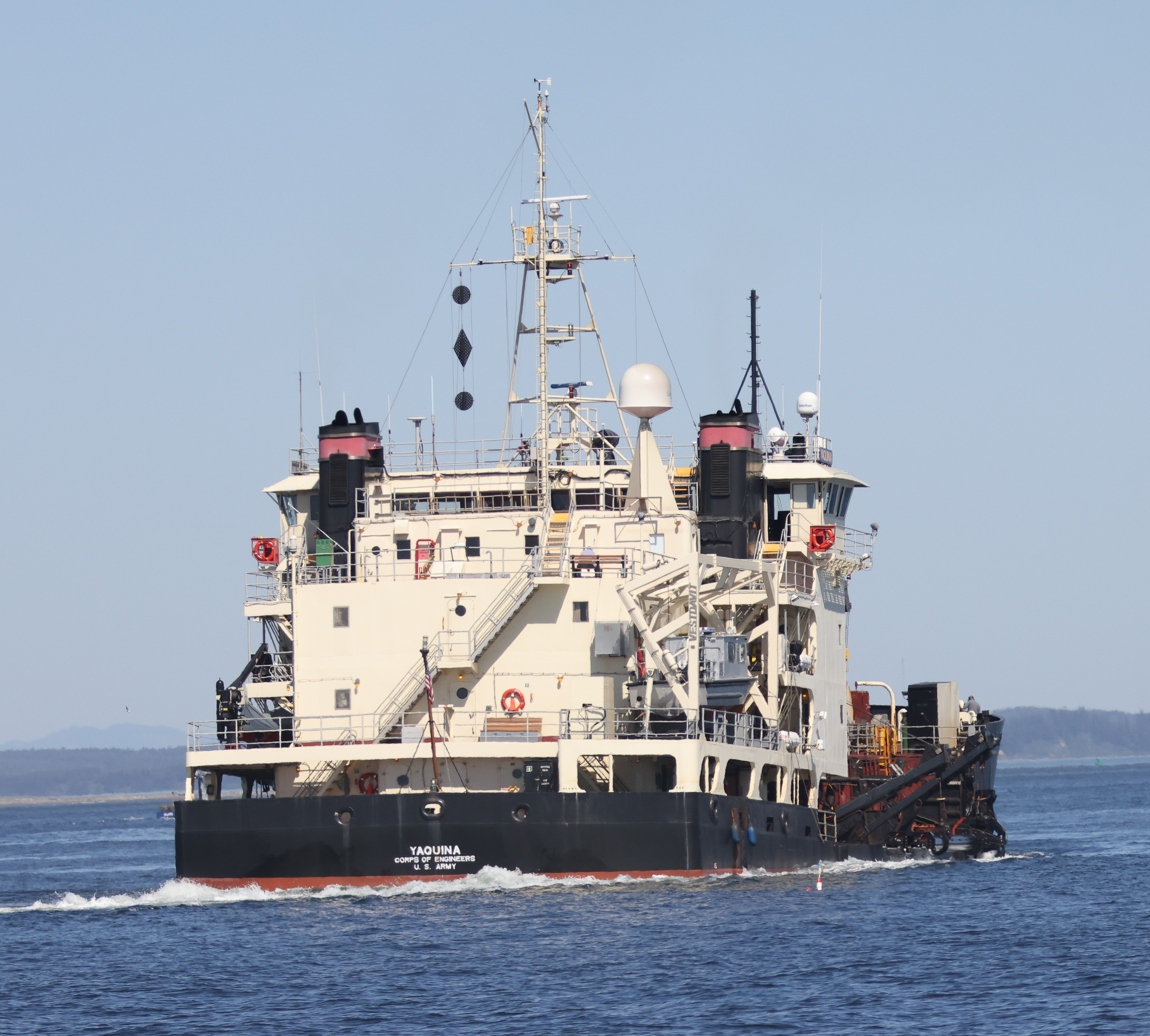
USAV Yaquina in Grays Harbor, WA in 2021

==== Washington ====
- Grays Harbor
- Willapa Bay

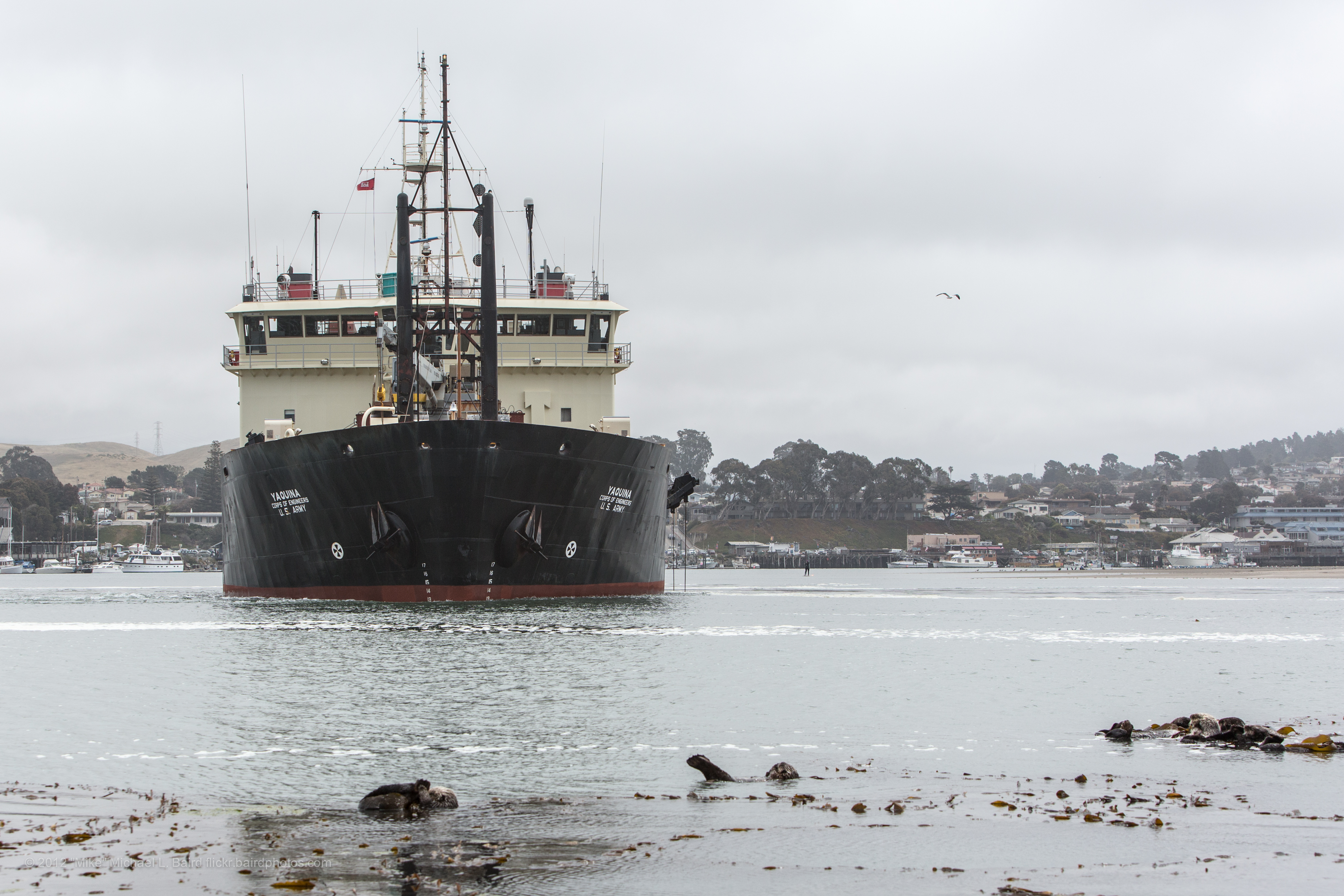
USAV Yaquina in Morro Bay, CA in 2012

==== Oregon ====
- Chetco River
- Coquille River
- Columbia River
- Columbia River Bar
- Coos Bay
- Rogue River
- Siuslaw River
- Skipanon River
- Umpqua River
- Willamette River
- Yaquina Bay
- Yaquina River

==== California ====
- Humbolt Bay
- Morro Bay

=== Exxon Valdez response ===
On March 24, 1989 the Exxon Valdez ran aground in Prince William Sound, Alaska creating one of the largest oil spills in American history. On April 11, 1989 the task force overseeing the cleanup requested the use of Yaquina. She loaded up with a month's fuel and food, a supply of spare parts, two thousand yards of oil boom, extra foul-weather and cold-weather clothes for the crew, and even a 34-foot skimming vessel, before sailing from Portland. Rough weather in the Gulf of Alaska forced her to take the longer Inside Passage route, but the ship arrived in Prince William Sound on April 19, 1989.

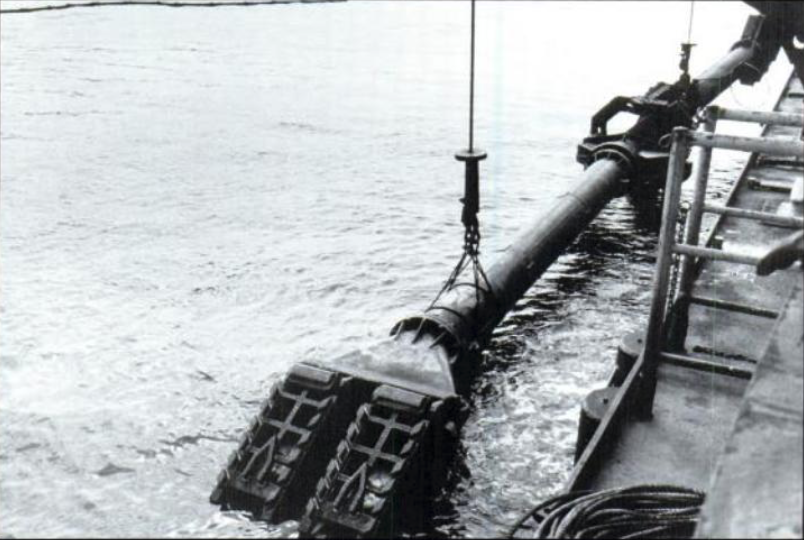
Inverted draghead used for oil recovery

Yaquina was not designed for oil recovery, and her initial skimming attempts failed. With her dragheads in their usual position, she sucked up more water than oil. Experimentation led to inverting her dragheads so that oil was sucked down from the surface. Within 15 minutes of the first trial of this new method, Yaquina pumped aboard 63,000 gallons of oil sludge. Yaquina proved capable of recovering 100 barrels of sludge per minute and her hopper could hold 4,000 barrels. The recovered sludge was pumped to an Exxon barge by reversing the dredge pumps. Yaquina began her skimming operations around Knight Island in Prince William Sound and worked her way southwest to Kukak Bay. She combined with another Corps of Engineers dredge, USAV Essayons, to recover 379,720 gallons of oil.

Since the ship was intended for operations in crowded harbors, she had advanced systems for tracking and communicating with multiple vessels. Thus, in addition to skimming, she was also used as a command and control platform for the many small vessels assisting in the cleanup.

By the end of May, 1989 most of the oil had dispersed or washed ashore, so Yaquina was unable to skim meaningful amounts from the sea. She was released back to her regular duties, but first had to be cleaned. She was a mess. The oil in her hopper had solidified into an asphalt-like consistency. This gunk incorporated rotting carcasses of various animals that had died in the spill and the combination was emitting poisonous gasses. It took 12 days of cleaning at Seward before she could sail back to Portland. She departed Alaskan waters on June 8, 1989 and arrived back in Portland on June 15.

The total cost of Yaquina's response to the oil spill was $674,687 which, after some contention, was reimbursed by Exxon.

=== Accidents ===
The ship's work routinely takes it to shallow water where ongoing silting requires dredging to restore a channel. This work is hazardous, and the ship has gone aground several times. The ship ran aground at the entrance to the Port of Bandon, Oregon and was stuck on the jetty for several days before she could be floated off. Yaquina hit an uncharted rock ledge while dredging a channel in the Umpqua River on July 27, 1990 which tore a 5-foot by 8-foot hole in its hull. Several compartments flooded and the ship settled into the mud. She was towed to Portland for repairs. She ran aground and was holed while dredging in Willapa Bay, Washington on August 9, 1997. Repairs were estimated at $50,000 to $100,000.

=== Other duties ===
Yaquina has taken aboard cadets from maritime academies seeking to earn sea-time credit during their Summer break. In summer 2000, for example, there were two cadets aboard.
