= Essayons (1908 tugboat) =

US Army Tugboat

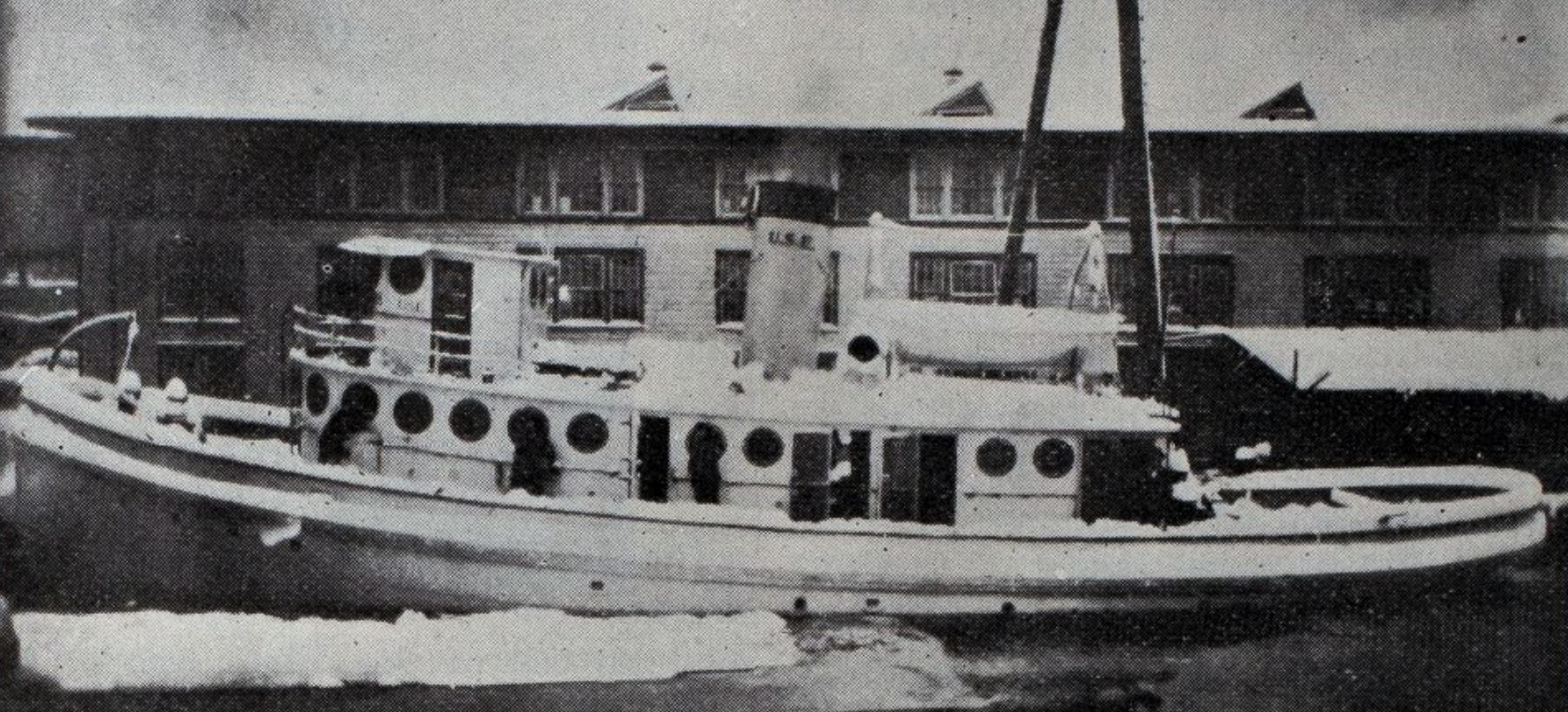
- Essayons ca. September 1908

History

United States
- Owner: U.S. Army Corps of Engineers
- Builder: Racine Boat Manufacturing Company
- Cost: $35,950
- Launched: August 21, 1908
- Fate: Sold at auction

United States
- Owner: Zenith Dredge Company
- Acquired: ca. 1949
- Identification: Call sign: WC5737
- Fate: Sold
- Notes: Official number 258278

General characteristics
- Tonnage: 117 gross tons, 42 net tons
- Displacement: 190 tons
- Length: 85 ft (26 m)
- Beam: 21 ft (6.4 m)
- Draft: 11.5 feet (3.5 m)
- Installed power: 450 horsepower
- Propulsion: Double-expansion steam engine
- Speed: 11.5 kn (21.3 km/h; 13.2 mph)
- Complement: 2 officers, 7 men

Essayons was a tugboat of the United States Army Corps of Engineers. Her mission with the Corps was to support the installation of breakwaters and piers, and the dredging of harbors on Lake Superior. She was built in 1908 and served with the Army until 1949, when she was sold to the Zenith Dredge Company. Essayons continued her support of port construction and maintenance under her new owner until the mid 1960s. In 1994 she was sold again, this time to a local businessman, who hoped to convert her into a floating Bed and Breakfast. This plan never came to fruition and she sank at her moorings in Duluth Harbor in 2009.

== Construction and characteristics ==
The Army Corps of Engineers was charged with building breakwaters and piers, and dredging in the port of Duluth. It expected to do some of this work in the winter, when the ice on Lake Superior provided a natural breakwater to protect the work in process. It designed Essayons to be exceptionally robust in order to operate in difficult winter conditions.

Essayons was built by the Racine Boat Manufacturing Company in Muskegon, Michigan. She was launched on August 21, 1908. A further two months was required to install her machinery and topside equipment. Her steam engine was built by Montague Iron Works and installed in Muskegon. It was a double-expansion engine with 16 and 34-inch cylinders, the pistons having a 26-inch stroke. It produced 450 horsepower. Essayons was towed to Ferrysburg, Michigan to have her coal-fired boiler installed. Her maximum speed was 11.5 knots. Her original cost was $35,950.

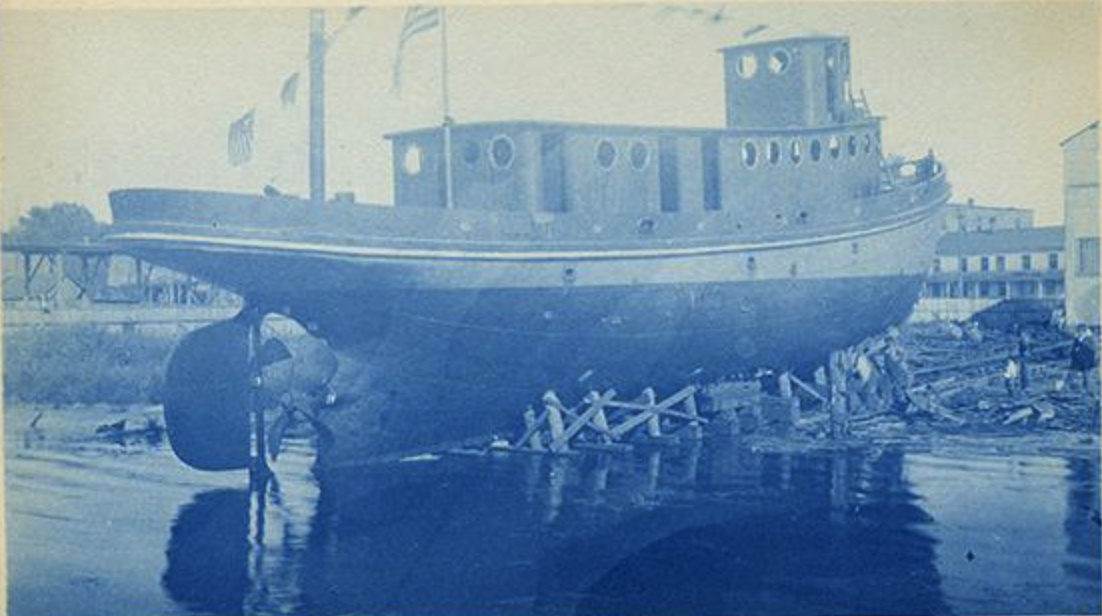
Essayons under construction, likely just before her launch in August 1908

Essayons was 85.5 feet (26.1 m) long and had a beam of 21 feet (6.4 m). Her draft was 10.5 feet (3.2 m). Her hull was constructed of steel plates. In order to strengthen her to break thin ice during her winter work, her bow was built of two layers of steel plates. The glass in her portholes was 1.25 inches (3.2 cm) thick to withstand gale winds. She was documented at 117 gross and 42 net registered tons. Her displacement was 190 tons.

She was crewed by 2 officers and 7 men. Sleeping accommodations were provided for all nine crew.

Essayons was at least the second vessel of that name to serve with the U.S. Army Corps of Engineers. An earlier Essayons was built in 1868 to dredge the mouth of the Mississippi. "Essayons" is the motto of the Corps of Engineers. It is a French word which means "Let us try."

== Army Corps of Engineers Service ==
Essayons was assigned to the Duluth District of the Army Corps of Engineers. She arrived at her new home port at the beginning of December 1908. The tug was not quite complete, but the Army Corps was eager to get her to Duluth before Lake Superior froze. The new tug found immediate use. The steamer Northern Queen was escorted back to Duluth for repairs by Essayons in December 1908 after being damaged in a collision.

Essayons' primary job was to support Army Corps of Engineers projects in Lake Superior. She towed derricks, dredges, pile drivers, and other floating construction equipment to their work sites. She towed barges filled with gravel and rock from shore to where breakwaters were built. She towed barges filled with dredging spoil away from shallow water.

Among her first jobs was a major renovation of the port of Duluth. In conjunction with two floating derricks, Essayons removed old timber piers and placed over 20,000 tons of stone as a breakwater. She also participated in dredging channels at Grand Marais, Michigan and Ontonagon, Michigan. Occasionally, her work took her beyond Lake Superior, as in 1934, when she assisted in dredging near Sandusky.

The tug's working routine was punctuated by a few notable events. On April 22, 1911 her crew rescued two fishermen whose boat sank about a mile into Lake Superior. On March 29, 1930 Essayons was the first vessel to pass under the new aerial lift bridge between Duluth and Superior, Wisconsin. Essayons underwent a major refit in 1935. In January of that year, a $25,581contract was awarded to Marine Iron and Shipbuilding Company of Duluth for work on the tug, including maintenance of the boiler.

In November 1948 the Army Corps of Engineers announced its intention to sell Essayons to the highest bidder. She was purchased by the Zenith Dredge Company of Duluth. It appears that the transaction closed quickly since Essayons was documented as belonging to her new owner in 1949.

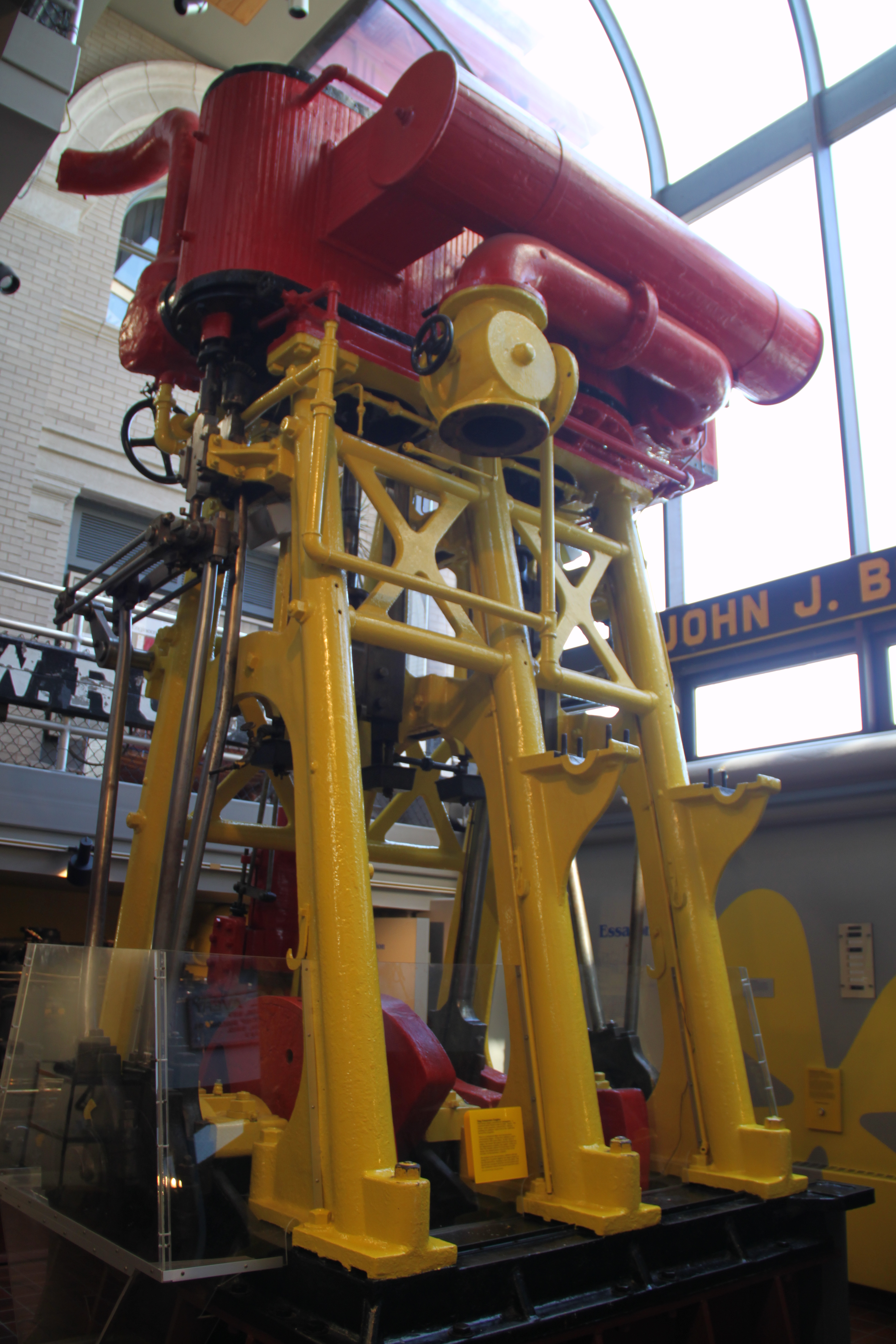
Essayons' original steam engine now in the Lake Superior Maritime Museum

== Zenith Dredge Company Service ==
Zenith Dredge Company was engaged in civil construction of ports, building breakwaters, piers, and dredging. It bid on and won contracts from the Army Corps of Engineers and private firms to do this work. Thus, it appears that Essayons continued to do the same sort of work as a contractor that she did when she was owned by the Corps. Among these projects was dredging the river at Ontonagon, Michigan in July 1965, a project she had done as an Army vessel thirty years earlier.

Zenith Dredge continued to sail Essayons using her original steam engine. She was taking on coal in Duluth Harbor in December 1962 when her load shifted. The tug listed to port and took on water. A crane was required to raise her and return her to an even keel. It is not clear that this event precipitated Essayons' retirement, but in 1963 Zenith Dredge bought a replacement tug for its fleet. One source reports that Essayons was finally retired due to persistent engine overheating in 1965, but she remained documented until at least 1972, suggesting that she may have been used occasionally.

== Retirement ==
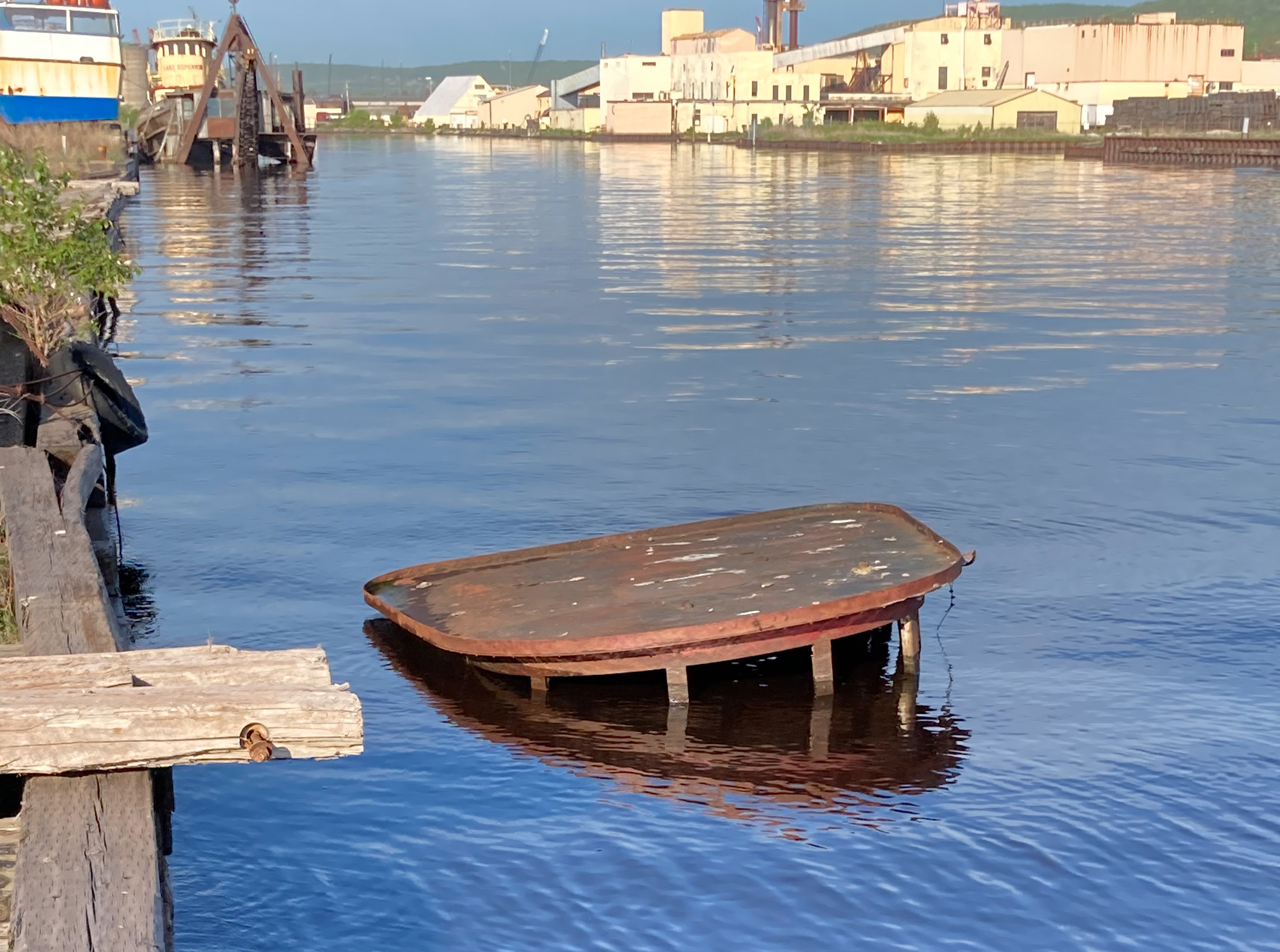
The pilothouse of Essayons, still showing in 2022 at the berth where she sank in 2009.

The tug was purchased by Duluth businessman Hobart Finn, in 1994. She was opened to the public as a coffee shop and gift store, but Finn hoped to convert her to a bed-and-breakfast hotel. Little progress was made to that end and she was vandalized in 1997 and 2004, causing thousands of dollars of damage.

On March 23, 2009 Essayons sank at her moorings at the Duluth Timber Company slip and came to rest on the bottom in 20 feet (6.1 m) of water. She has never been raised.

== Legacy ==
Essayons' original steam engine, still bearing its Montague Iron Works plate, was donated to the Lake Superior Maritime Museum in Duluth by Zenith Dredge. Her name has been carried on by two Army Corps of Engineers dredges, the USAV Essayons built in 1949, and after that ship's retirement, another USAV Essayons built in 1982.
