= Miles D. McAlester =

Miles Daniel McAlester
- Miles Daniel McAlester
- Born: March 21, 1833; Belfast, New York, US
- Died: April 23, 1869 (aged 36); Buffalo, New York, US
- Burial place: Hollenback Cemetery; Wilkes-Barre, Pennsylvania, US
- Military career
- Allegiance: United States of America; Union
- Branch: United States Army; Union Army
- Service years: 1856–1869
- Rank: Major; Brevet Brigadier General
- Conflicts: American Civil War: Peninsula Campaign; Battle of Mobile Bay

Miles Daniel McAlester (March 21, 1833 – April 23, 1869) was a career United States Army officer and a Union Army major during the American Civil War. In 1867, he was nominated and confirmed for appointment to the grade of brevet brigadier general in the Regular Army, to rank from April 9, 1865.

== Early life and career ==
McAlester was born in Belfast, New York. He entered the United States Military Academy at West Point in July 1852, and graduated four years later standing third out of 49 cadets. He was appointed a brevet second lieutenant on July 1, 1856, in the coveted Army Engineers. On December 1 he was promoted to second lieutenant.

== Civil War service ==
McAlester was the lead engineer for the Defenses of Washington from April 1861 until March 1862, during which he was promoted to first lieutenant on May 1, 1861. His next assignment was as chief engineer for the Army of the Potomac's III Corps from April to July 1862. During the Peninsula Campaign that March–July, McAlester was singled out twice for his conduct, winning brevets to major and to lieutenant colonel on July 1, 1862.

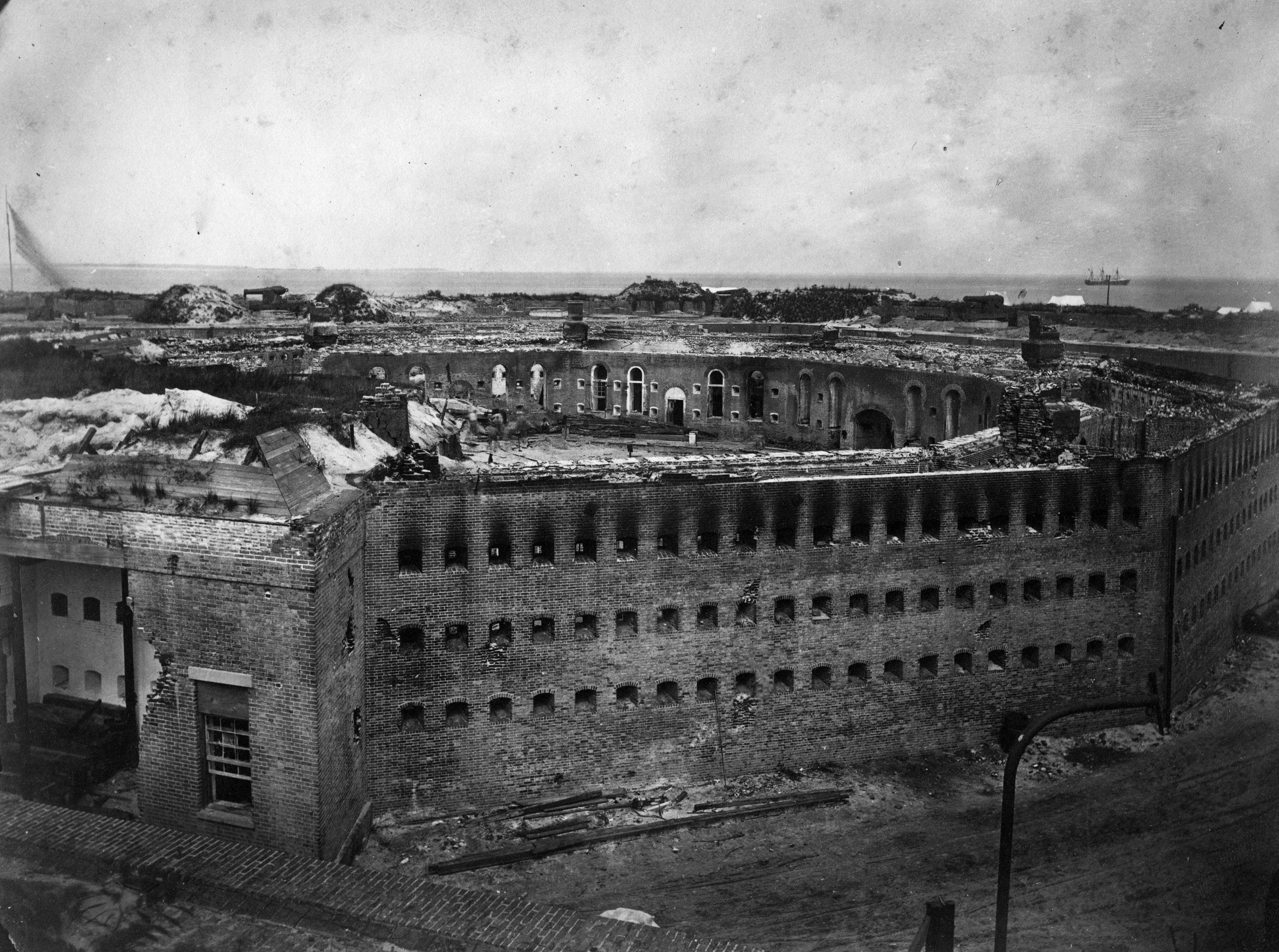
Ft. Morgan, Mobile Point, Ala. in 1864

That fall McAlester was appointed the lead engineer of the Department of Ohio from October 30, 1862 into January 1863, when he joined the Army of the Tennessee to perform the same duty until August 9. During this time he was promoted to captain in the Regular army to rank from March 3. Then he was lead engineer for the Defenses of Cincinnati from August 9 into July 1864. On July 15 he was made lead engineer of the Federal Department of the Gulf (Military Division of West Mississippi) until July 16, 1865.

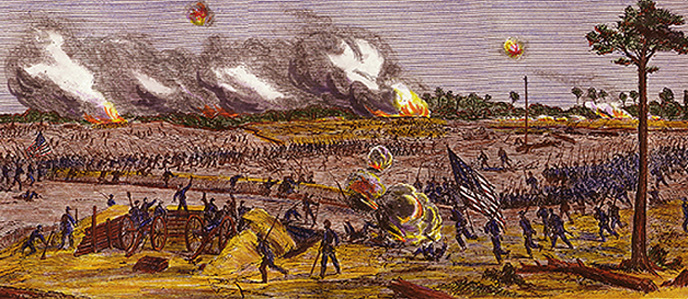
The storming of Ft. Blakeley in 1865

McAlester was in Alabama during the sieges of Forts Gaines and Morgan in August 1864, and was appointed a brevet colonel for his performance during these battles on August 23. On March 2, 1867, President Andrew Johnson nominated and the United States Senate confirmed McAlester for appointment to the grade of brevet brigadier general of volunteers, to rank from April 9, 1865, for his conduct during the fight and capture of Mobile at the Battle of Fort Blakeley on April 9, 1865.

.

== Postbellum ==
Following the end of the war McAlester chose to continue his career and remained in the small peacetime U.S. Army. He was promoted to major on March 7, 1867. McAlester oversaw the design and construction of the dredge boat Essaysons. He died in Buffalo, New York in 1869.

He was buried in Hollenback Cemetery in Wilkes-Barre, Pennsylvania.

== Engineer's plans ==
During the course of his duties in the Civil War, McAlester prepared several detailed maps of Confederate fortifications the Federals encountered. Two of his plans are shown below, both depicting the defenses and approaches to Confederate-held Fort Blakeley at Mobile, Alabama, in 1865. They are included in the Official Records, published in 1892.

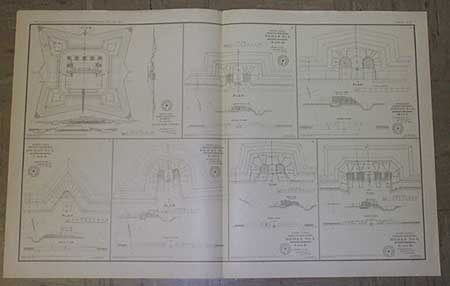
Ft. Blakeley plans, approaches and redans

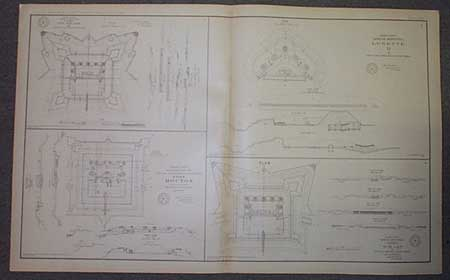
Ft. Blakeley plans, surrounding area

The first picture shows seven plans for forts and redans leading to Fort Blakeley, while the second picture shows all four major defenses in the surrounding area.

== See also ==
- List of American Civil War brevet generals (Union)
