= Dredge turning gland =

Ship machinery component

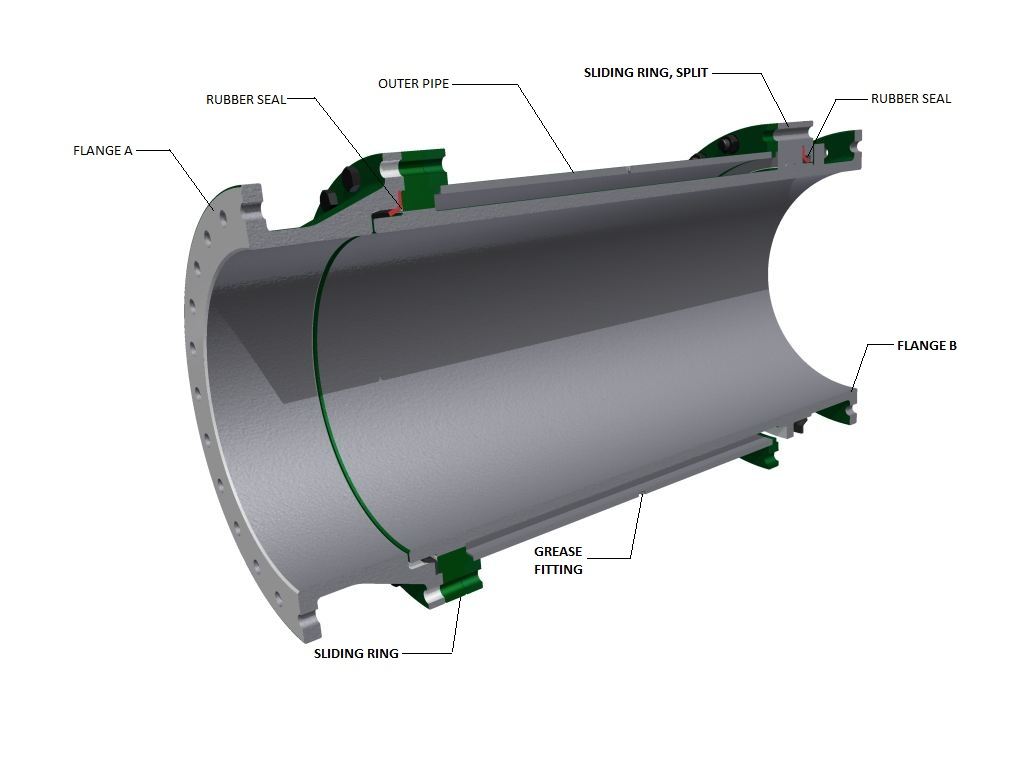
Turning gland section view

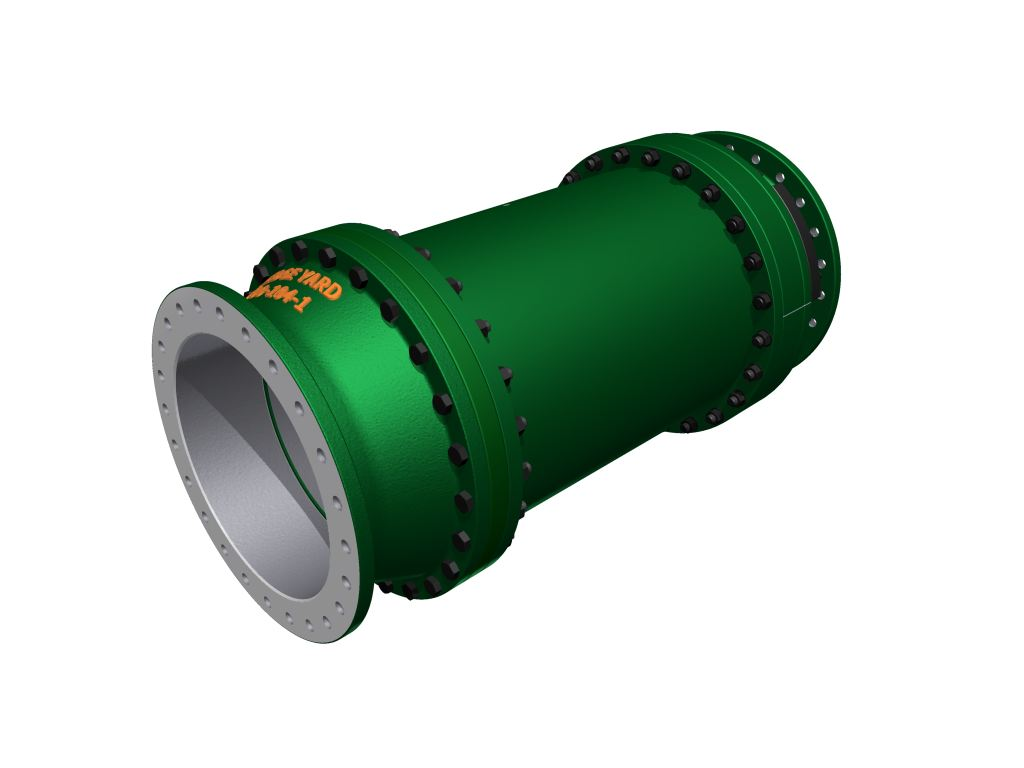
Turning Gland 700

Dredge turning gland is a trailing suction hopper dredger component.

== Features ==
The dredge turning gland has a special particularity. Attached to the lower suction pipe the dredge turning gland allows a radial rotation in both directions of 15°. Due to this particularity the dredge turning gland enable the dredge drag head to follow the sea bottom without losing vacuum The dredge turning gland’s flanges are cast together with the body of the pipes and a rubber lip seal is used for the sealing of the dredge turning glands

== Materials used ==
Carbon steel and Carbon Manganese Steel are the Materials used for the production of pipe and flanges of the dredge turning glands. Cast iron is used for the production of the sliding pieces of the dredge turning glands.
