= USAV Essayons (1949 ship) =

US Army dredge

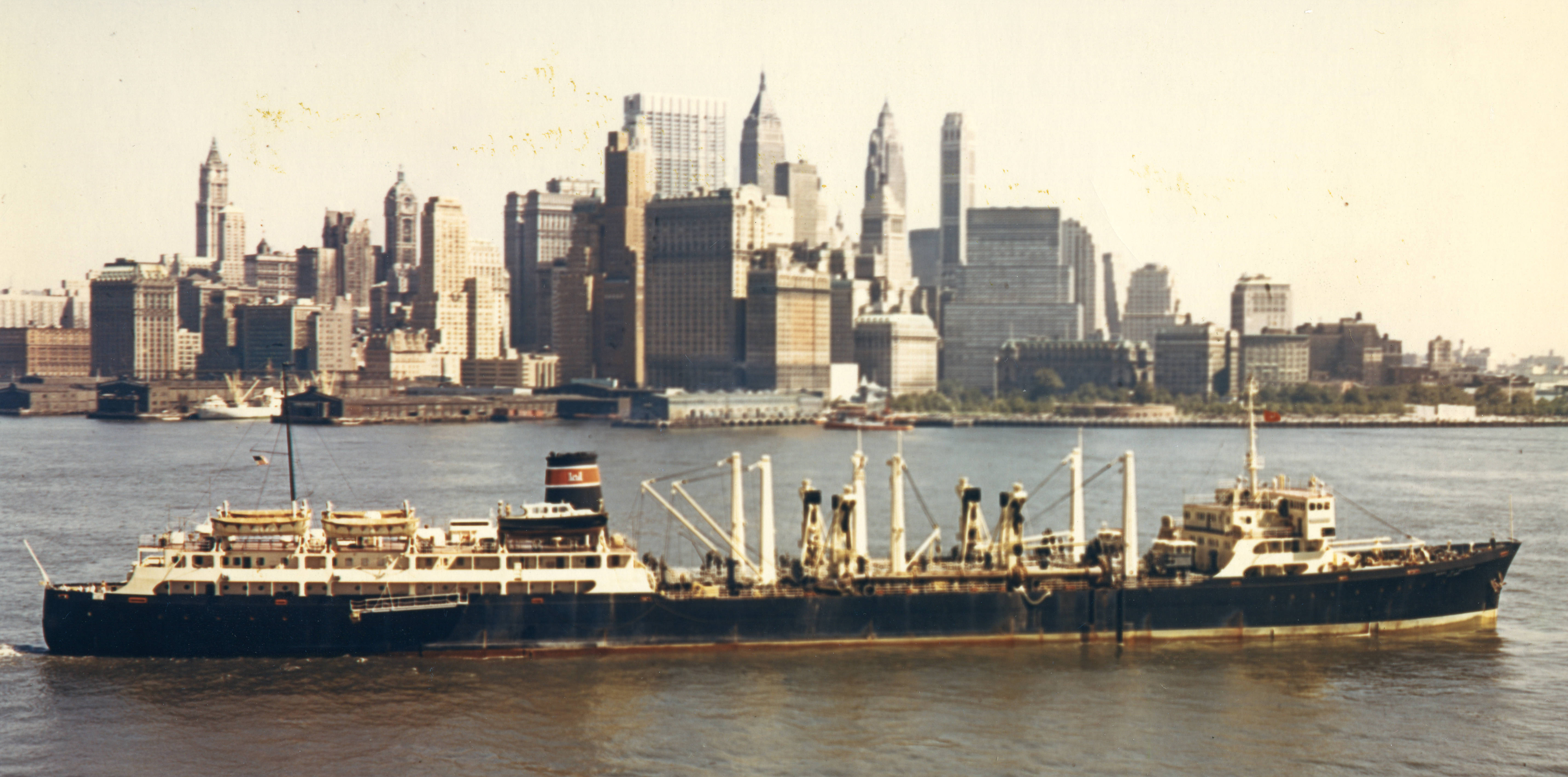
- USAV Essayons

History

United States
- Builder: Sun Shipbuilding & Drydock Company
- Cost: $10 million
- Laid down: June 19, 1947
- Launched: August 25, 1949
- Commissioned: January 16, 1950
- Decommissioned: March 24, 1980
- Identification: IMO number: 7739909
- Fate: Scrapped in India, 1992

General characteristics
- Class & type: Hopper drege
- Displacement: 9,968 long tons light; 21,808 long tons with full hoppers
- Length: 525.17 ft (160.07 m)
- Beam: 72 ft (22 m)
- Draft: 28 feet (8.5 m) maximum
- Speed: 17.3 kn (32.0 km/h; 19.9 mph) maximum
- Complement: 18 officers, 101 men

USAV Essayons was a hopper dredge of the United States Army Corps of Engineers. At the time of her construction, she was the largest hopper dredge ever built. She was the flagship of the Army Corps of Engineers dredge fleet. Her primary mission was to maintain the entrance to New York Harbor and other East Coast ports, but she was employed all around the United States and at several international locations. She was launched in 1949 and retired in 1980.

== Construction and characteristics ==
Essayons was designed by the Army Corps of Engineers Marine Division staff in Philadelphia, Pennsylvania. She was built by Sun Shipbuilding and Drydock Company of Chester, Pennsylvania. Her keel was laid on June 19, 1947, and she was launched on August 25, 1949. Lieutenant General Lewis A. Pick, Chief of Engineers of the U.S. Army, was the keynote speaker at the ceremony. His wife, Alice Pick, christened the vessel. After her sea trials, she was commissioned on January 16, 1950. Her original cost was reported as $10 million.

The ship was assigned to the New York District of the Army Corps of Engineers upon commissioning. She was transferred to the Philadelphia District on June 24, 1961.

Essayons was 525.17 feet (160.07 m) long and had a beam of 72 feet (22 m). Her hull was constructed of welded steel plates. Her maximum draft was 28 feet (8.5 m) when her hoppers were loaded with dredging spoil. She displaced 9,968 long tons when light, and 21,808 long tons with a full load of dredging spoil. Her hull contained twelve hoppers which could hold, in total, up to 8,000 cubic yards of dredging spoil. These hoppers ran for 180 feet (55 m) of the ship's length.

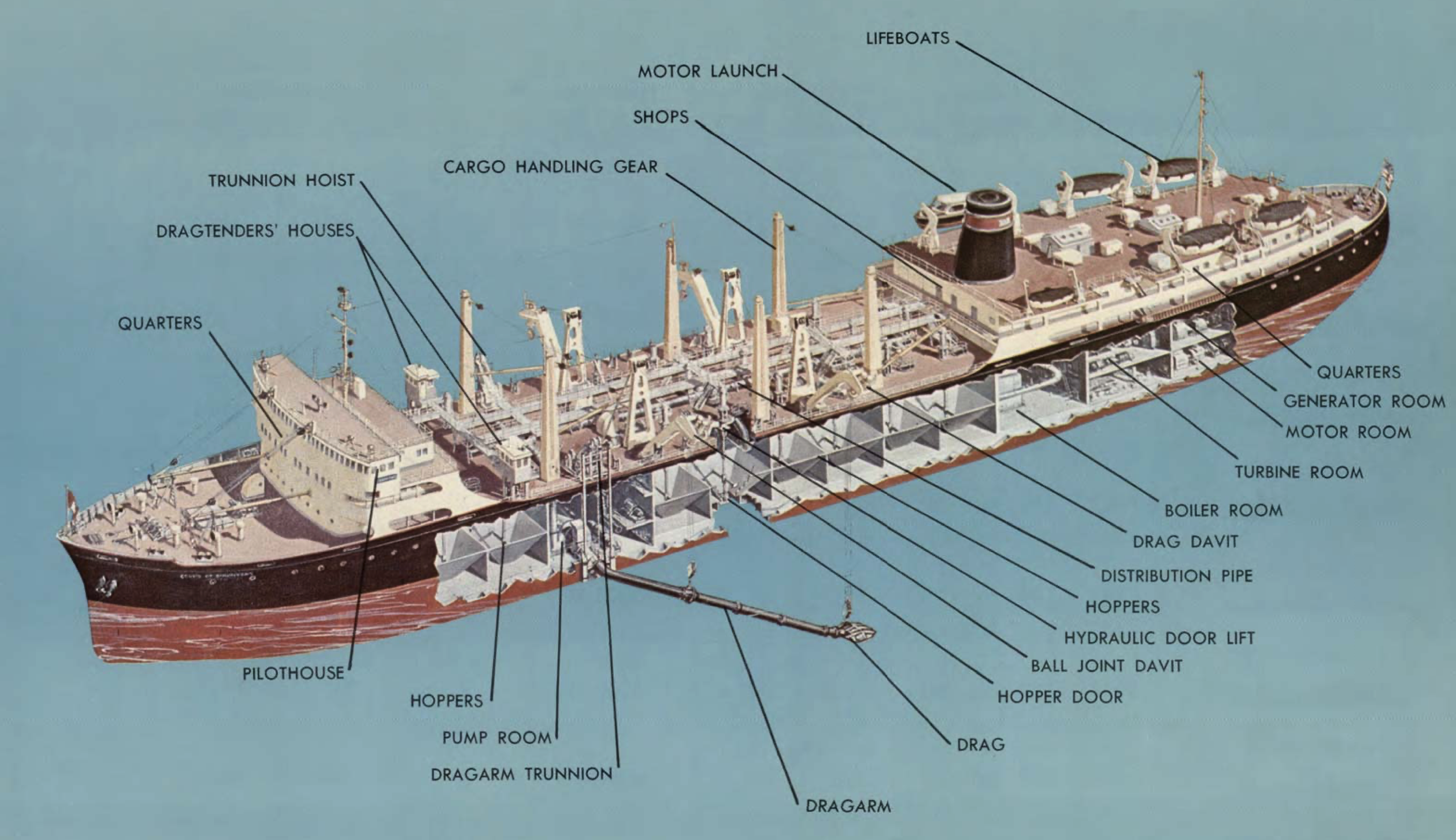
Cut-away view of Essayons

Essayons was propelled by two four-bladed propellers which were 16 feet (4.9 m) in diameter. These were driven by two turbo-electric engines which developed 4,000 horsepower each. She was capable of speeds up to 17.3 knots (19.9 mph) when lightly loaded, and 16.55 knots (19.05 mph) with her hoppers full. The ship's two oil-fired boilers developed high-pressure steam (575 psig) for propulsion and electrical generation. Her tanks held 7,000 barrels of bunker C fuel, giving her an unrefueled cruising range of approximately 7,700 statute miles. She was crewed by 18 officers and 101 men. Dredging continued around the clock, so the crew worked in shifts. Men worked 10 days and then got four days off. The ship had a machine shop, store, a crew lounge with a ping-pong table, a six-bed medical dispensary, laundry facilities, a cook staff and full galley for meal service, and separate dining rooms for officers and men.

Essayons was at least the third vessel of that name to serve with the U.S. Army Corps of Engineers and the second dredge. An earlier Essayons was built in 1868 to dredge the mouth of the Mississippi. "Essayons" is the motto of the Corps. It is a French word which means "Let us try."

== Operating history ==
=== Dredging operations ===
Essayons was designed to dredge New York Harbor. She sucked sand, silt, and mud off the bottom of navigable waterways to increase their depth, creating a channel allowing larger ships to pass. She pulled two suctionheads, referred to as "dragheads", along the seafloor as she moved slowly through the water. The dragheads were connected to pipes which were 36 inches (91 cm) in diameter called "drag arms" that descended from both sides of the ship. Using two winches each, these drag arms could be lowered to reach bottom as deep as 60 feet (18 m). Loose material on the seafloor entered the dragheads and was pulled up through the drag arms by 1,850 horsepower electric pumps. It was then deposited in a hopper in the middle of the ship. All the hoppers were filled after one to two hours of dredging. At this point the drag arms were raised and the ship sailed to deep water beyond Sandy Hook. Here she opened doors in the bottom of the hoppers, allowing the dredge spoil to fall to the sea bottom. The uniquely long transit associated with the disposal areas off New York Harbor resulted in a design which gave her twice the hopper capacity and significantly higher speed than other dredges at that time.

While Essayons was designed to dredge New York Harbor and spent much of her time doing so, she was capable of dredging any major waterway. Among the areas where she worked were:

- Baltimore Harbor
- Columbia River
- Guantanamo Bay
- Pensacola Bay
- Mississippi River Delta
- Mobile Bay
- Suez Canal
- Tampa Bay
- York River

=== Suez Canal Dredging ===
The United States government, which had backed Egypt through the Suez Crisis in 1956, leased Essayons to the Suez Canal Authority to assist in widening the canal and repairing damage from the war. An agreement between the two governments was signed in December 1958. The Egyptian government was charged $8,000 per day, $1,600 less than was charged to domestic clients. The US State Department recommended the Corps of Engineers lease "in the interest of international goodwill". President Eisenhower approved the deal.

Essayons left New York Harbor on March 5, 1959. Once in Egypt, Essayons deepened the roadstead and harbor in Port Said, the northern and southern anchorages in Great Bitter Lake, and the main channel through the lake itself. All told, she dredged 10 million cubic yards. She encountered two major issues while working on this project. Despite her experience in busy New York Harbor, the number of ships moving through the canal and roadsteads proved to be a constant challenge. A special set of signal lights was established to prevent collisions. A second issue was the intensely salty water in Great Bitter Lake. She had difficulty evaporating seawater to provide fresh water for the boilers. Her crew had to clean the evaporators more frequently than normal to keep the salt at bay. She finished her work in Egypt on September 13, 1959. The ship returned to New York on October 2, 1959.

== Retirement ==
The commercial dredging industry had long resented having to compete with government ships for new contracts. They were supported in Congress, and no new dredges were built for the Corps of Engineers between 1967 and 1980. Instead, new private dredges took on more work and became more capable, and older Army Corps of Engineers dredges were retired. By 1980, private vessels rivaled Essayons in capability. Further, Essayons, with its large crew, had become economically uncompetitive as dredging technology advanced over 30 years. The ship was decommissioned on March 24, 1980. After decommissioning, Essayons was moored in the U.S. Maritime Administration reserve fleet in the James River. The Maritime Administration originally took the position that, under current law, Essayons could not be sold for scrap. She was instead designated as a target vessel and was to be sunk for target practice. Congressional investigators found that $2.3 million of salable materials would be sunk with her and stopped that plan. After a decade in the reserve fleet, she was indeed sold for scrap and towed to India where she was broken up. She left on her final voyage in November 1991.
