= Trailing suction hopper dredger =

Ship type

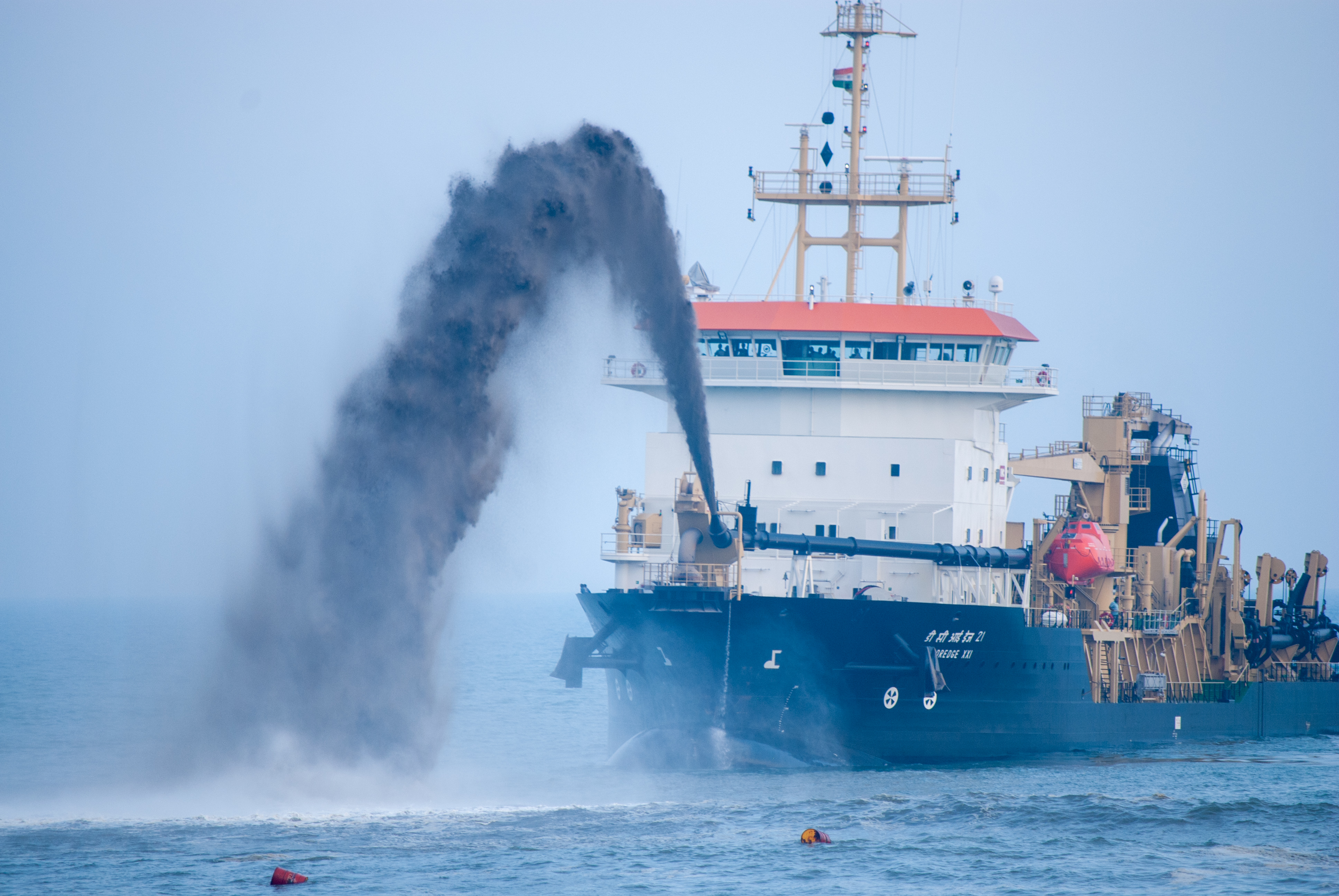
DCI Dredge XV (ship, 1999) (IMO 9164122) at Visakhapatnam, India

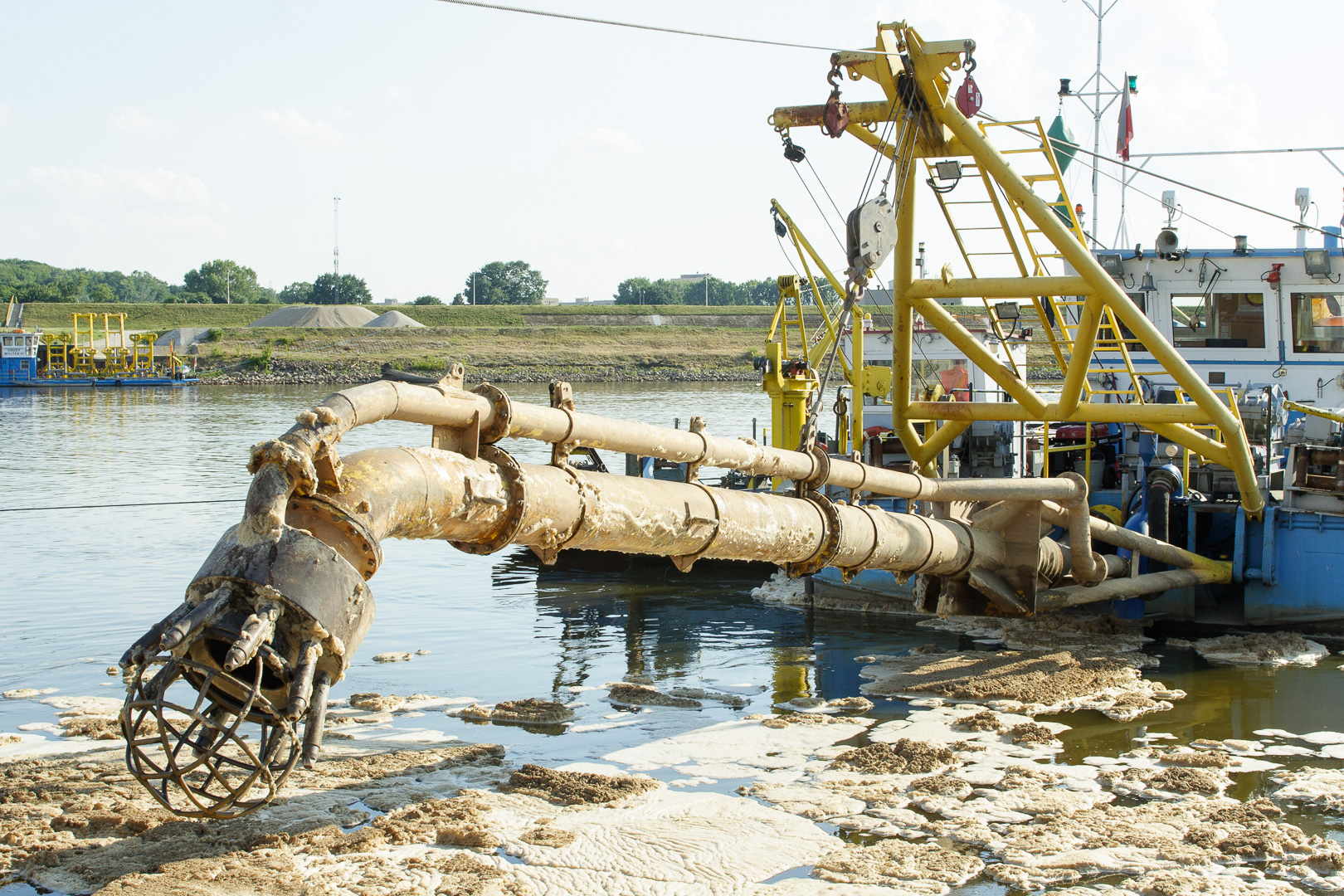
The dredge drag head of a suction dredge barge on the Vistula River, Warsaw, Poland

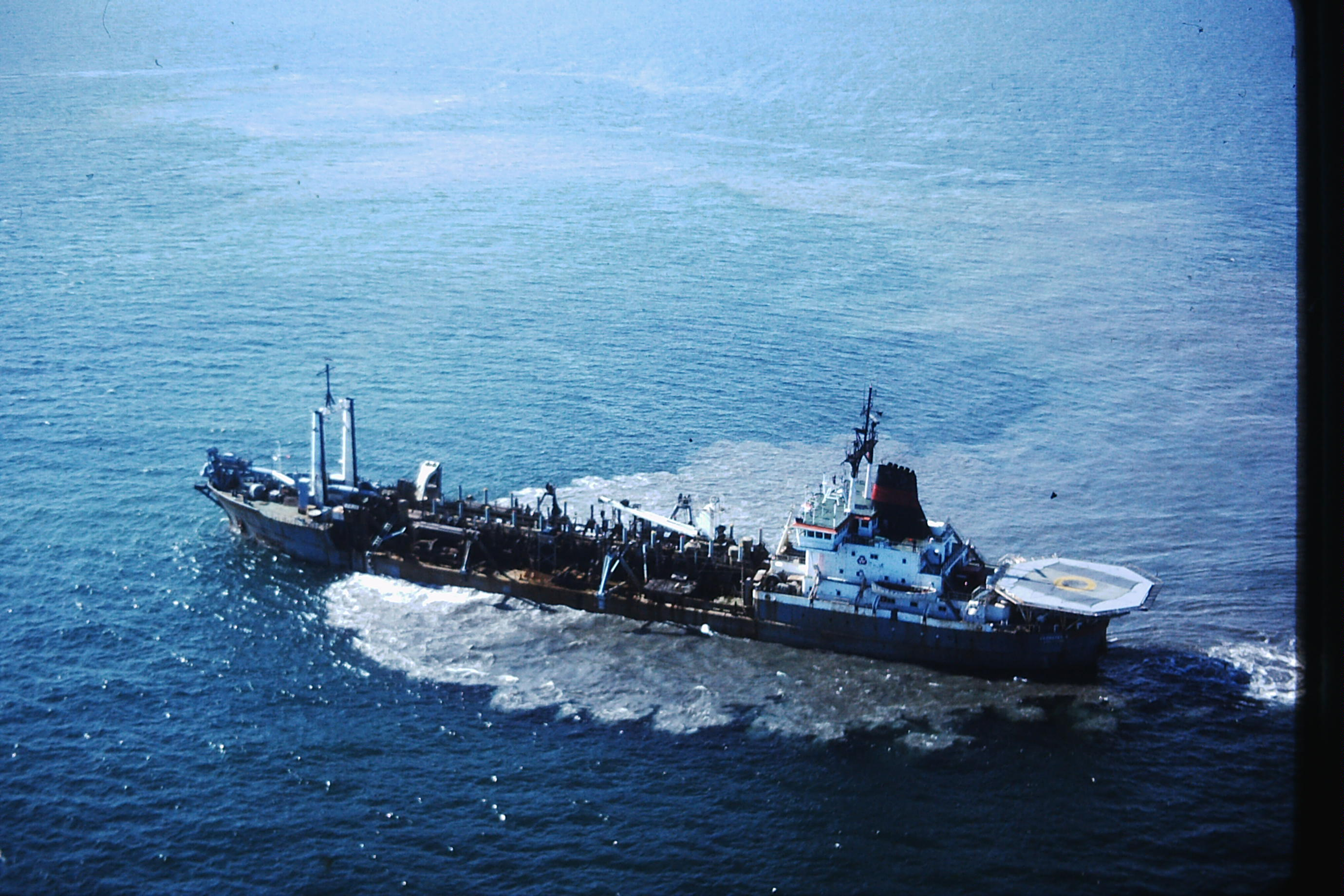
Trailing suction hopper dredger in action in 1987, Beaufort Sea near Tuktoyaktuk

A trailing suction hopper dredger (TSHD) is a type of ship capable of maintaining navigable waterways, deepening the maritime canals that are threatened to become silted, constructing new land elsewhere or replacing sand eroded by storms or wave action on the beaches. This is made possible by large, powerful pumps and engines able to suck sand, clay, silt and gravel.

== Operation ==
=== Properties ===
A trailing suction hopper dredger is self-loading/unloading and sometimes equipped with a pressurized discharging system.

=== Loading ===
From the side of the ship one or two suction pipes descend to the bottom of the seabed. On the end of the pipe a so-called trailing drag head is connected. This head is comparable to a large vacuum cleaner and is trailed along the seabed. In the head there are nozzles connected to a high pressure water installation that are capable of loosening the material on the seabed. Due to lower pressure in the pipe, the material will be sucked inward and discharged in the hopper.

The vessel should always have a positive speed over the ground. It is possible to regulate the density of the sucked substance. If the head is lowered, more material will be sucked but this risks damaging the installation because the material can get stuck inside the pipes. Once the mixture is loaded inside the hopper, the substance will sink and the water is discharged overboard, saving on storage space. A trailing suction hopper dredger can only suck relatively loose substance because the steel teeth are not so big. Harder substances such as rock or ironbased rock must be destroyed by a cutter.

=== Discharging ===
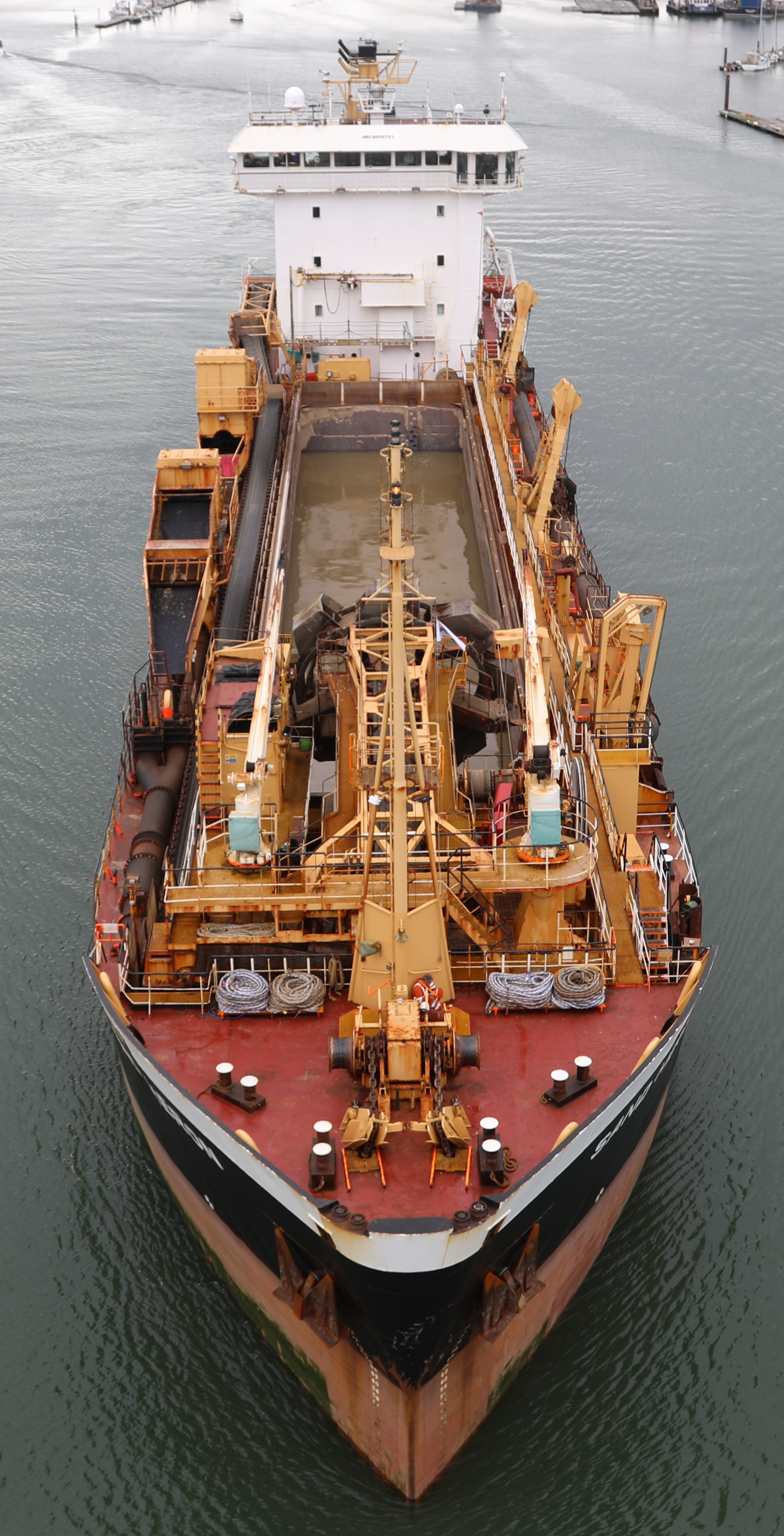
MV Sand Heron with the hopper visible

There are several ways to discharge a TSHD. The most common way is dumping the material.

- Dumping – This is done by simply opening the doors that close the hopper. Once opened the substance will simply drop to the seabed because of gravity. The hopper will never be completely empty because there will always be some residue and water left inside.
- Pressing – High-pressure pumps will pump water inside the hopper to loosen or even liquefy the substance, which can then be pumped via long hoses over great distances (f.i. ashore)
- Rainbowing – This is the same principle as pressing, but instead of transporting the substance it will simply be blown away. This is often used to create land.
- Crane – It is always possible to discharge the load with a crane, but this will be a time-consuming process.

== Equipment ==
A trailing suction hopper dredger is equipped with the following equipment:

- One, or more, rearward extending suction pipes
- One or more, Dredging pumps to create an under pressure in order to suck the substance into the hopper
- Transportation tubes to transport the substance from the pipes to the hopper
- An overflow to discharge the redundant water overboard
- Degassing installation to extract any possible gas from the substance in order to reduce damage and increase fluency
- Dredge turning gland, allows a radial rotation in both directions

== Functions ==
A dredging vessel and particularly a TSHD is mostly used for

- Maintaining the depth of a harbor, canal or waterway.
- Constant delivery of sand for land reclamation or beach nourishment.
