= Essayons (1868 ship) =

US Army dredge

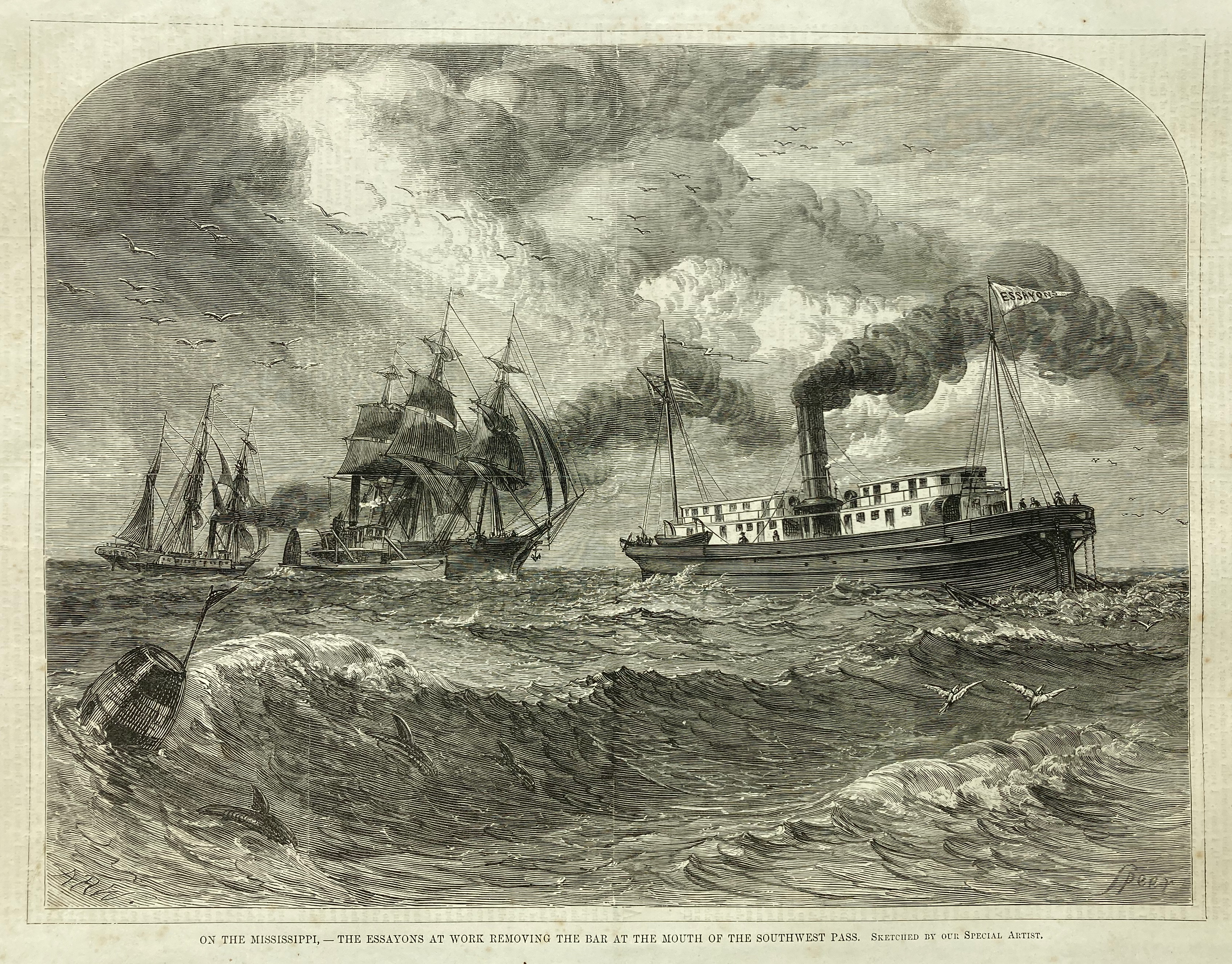
- Essayons dredging Southwest Pass in 1871

History

United States
- Builder: Atlantic Works
- Cost: $233,000
- Launched: March 9, 1868

General characteristics
- Tonnage: 650 tons burthen
- Length: 160 ft (49 m)
- Beam: 30 ft (9.1 m)
- Draft: 15 feet (4.6 m)

Essayons was a dredge boat of the United States Army Corps of Engineers built to clear navigable channels at the mouth of the Mississippi River. The ship was launched in 1868 and named after the Corps' motto, a French word meaning "let us try." Her design was unusual and ultimately not successful. She was mechanically unreliable, and spent much of her career undergoing repairs and upgrades to improve her performance. She was sold by the Corps of Engineers in 1882. It is not clear that she had any further employment.

== Origin ==
The Mississippi River has always been a major route for waterborne commerce. Large volumes of silt transported by the river produced constant shoaling and shifting of navigable channels at the river's mouth which was a barrier to this commerce. Larger ships using the Port of New Orleans struggled to transit the river's mouth due to a lack of a deepwater channel, and many went aground. Consequently, dredging at the mouth of the Mississippi began during the French administration of Louisiana.

After the Civil War, merchants in New Orleans were eager to ship cotton and other agricultural commodities overseas, but the channel had silted in to a depth of only 14 feet (4.3 m). Worse, because of the shoaling, a number of shipwrecks dotted the channel. On June 23, 1867, Congress appropriated $75,000 "for improving the mouth of the Mississippi" and sent brevet Lieutenant Colonel Miles D. McAlester, Captain of Engineers, to take charge. After contracting with private dredgers without notable success, McAlester decided that the Corps of Engineers needed its own dredges. The Army and Congress agreed, and on March 29, 1867, authorized the construction of two dredge boats (but funded only one) to maintain a channel at the mouth of the Mississippi.

McAlester designed Essayons based on his previous experience with the private dredges. He advertised for proposals to build the ship, and the bidding was won by the Atlantic Works in East Boston. Contracts were signed on October 15, 1867. The ship was to be delivered on April 10, 1868, for a fixed price of $233,000. Construction of the hull was subcontracted to Curtis, Smith & Company, which launched the ship on March 9, 1868. All the boilers, engines, pumps and other machinery were made by Atlantic Works. After sea trials, including some dredging in Long Island Sound, Essayons sailed from Boston for New Orleans on June 17, 1868. She broke down en route and returned to Fort Monroe in Virginia for repairs on July 1, 1868.

== Construction and characteristics ==
Essayons was 160 feet (49 m) long, with a beam of 30 feet (9.1 m). Her hull was built of white oak and live oak. She had a single, conventional propeller, 12 feet (3.7 m) in diameter, mounted at her stern, for propulsion. She also had a four-bladed propeller, 14 feet (4.3 m) in diameter mounted on her bow which was used to dredge. The blades of this propeller swung in an arc that was 2 feet (61 cm) deeper than the ship's keel. The aft propeller was driven by a 300 horsepower coal-fired direct-acting steam engine. Its cylinder was 40 inches (100 cm) in diameter and its piston had a stroke of 4 feet (1.2 m). The forward propeller was driven by two such engines mounted in the bow.

At both the bow and stern, the ship had toothed, iron rakes which could be lowered to the bottom. The handles of the rakes were 14 feet (4.3 m) long. They each had 20 teeth which were 1 foot (30 cm) long. A separate steam engine provided power to raise and lower the rakes.

There were six tanks which could be flooded with seawater to change the trim of the ship. These were used to sink the bow down, driving the dredging propeller deeper into the mud on each successive pass of the ship. With all her tanks flooded, the dredging propeller could reach a maximum of 22 feet (6.7 m) deep. Four steam engine-driven pumps were used to empty these compartments, when work was done, to return the ship to an even keel.

There were rudders and pilothouses at both the bow and stern of the ship, so she could be piloted both into a sand bank she was dredging and out of it again as she made multiple passes to widen a channel.

Essayons employed a technique called "agitation dredging". The theory was to stir up as much sediment as possible and let the river's current carry it away to be deposited in deeper water. Her dredging method was to approach a sand bar from its seaward, deeper, side using her aft propeller. When the ship grounded, the stern rake would be lowered to the bottom. Seacocks would be opened to flood the tanks in her bow, lowering the dredging propeller into the silt. At this point the dredging propeller at the bow would be engaged. As it churned through the mud, the ship was pulled forward. Material thrown up by the propeller would wash aft, carried by the river's current, and fall into the deeper water. Similarly, the rake dragging through the mud at the stern would churn up material to be washed into deeper water. After cutting into the bank, Essayons would raise its stern rake, drop its bow rake and back down its course scattering more mud and silt to be deposited in deeper water. This would leave a cut 14 feet (4.3 m) wide.

She had a crew of 34 men, including the captain, 2 mates, a chief engineer, 3 first assistant engineers, 3 oilers, 6 firemen, 6 coal passers, 2 stokers, 2 cooks, and 8 seamen.

"Essayons" is the motto of the U.S. Army Corps of Engineers. It is a French word which means "Let us try."

== Operating history ==
Essayons began dredging the Southwest Pass channel in the mouth of the Mississippi on September 19, 1868. She immediately broke down. The ship was plagued with mechanical troubles in her early days, at one point breaking off all four blades of her dredging propeller. With so much time idle for repairs, she worked only 68 days in her first ten months in New Orleans. In 1869 she began dredging a different channel into the Mississippi, Pass a l'Outre, and managed to deepen it to 17 feet (5.2 m). Shippers still preferred Southwest Pass, however, and in 1870 Essayons was returned there. She was able to dig a channel up to 18 feet (5.5 m) deep at times, but the river would sometimes silt up again overnight. On July 11, 1870, Congress appropriated a further $300,000 to maintain the mouth of the Mississippi. A portion of this money went towards repairs on Essayons with much of the rest paying for McAlester, a second Corps of Engineers dredge boat based on Essayons' design.

Even when the ship was operational, she was unable to make much progress both due to the inefficiency of agitation dredging and the fact that she was frequently called away to tow ships that had gone aground while attempting to cross the bar. In May 1875, she interrupted her dredging of Pass a l'Outre to assist nine different grounded vessels. Despite the addition of McAlester, a channel between New Orleans and the sea could not be reliably maintained. As many as fifty ships at a time anchored off Southwest Pass waiting for dredging to cut through sandbars. Shipping traffic declined and while the Corps of Engineers remained loyal to its dredges, frustrated shippers, and Congress began to search for other solutions.

A series of jetties were built which channelized the river. This arrangement proved easier to maintain. On August 14, 1876, Congress approved spending up to $100,000 to dredge the Southwest Pass until there was a channel 18 feet (5.5 m) deep. On August 27, 1877, inside the new jetties, this depth was attained and dredging was suspended. Eassyons was sent to Sabine Pass, Texas to dredge that channel. Here, after some early difficulties, she was more successful than she had been at the Mississippi, digging a channel 19 feet (5.8 m) deep.

== Retirement ==
By 1882, Essayons was worn and technologically outdated. With the jetties and newer dredges maintaining the mouth of the Mississippi, there was no further use for Essayons. She was sold at auction by the Corps of Engineers at New Orleans on August 2, 1882. Her price was $10,250. She remained in New Orleans and was advertised for sale by private parties in 1882, 1883, and 1884. It is unclear if she had any activity in those years. After an auction in 1884 she disappears from the newspaper accounts.
