= Eastern span replacement of the San Francisco–Oakland Bay Bridge =

Seismic stabilization megaproject in California (2002–2013)

San Francisco–Oakland Bay Bridge (eastern span replacement)
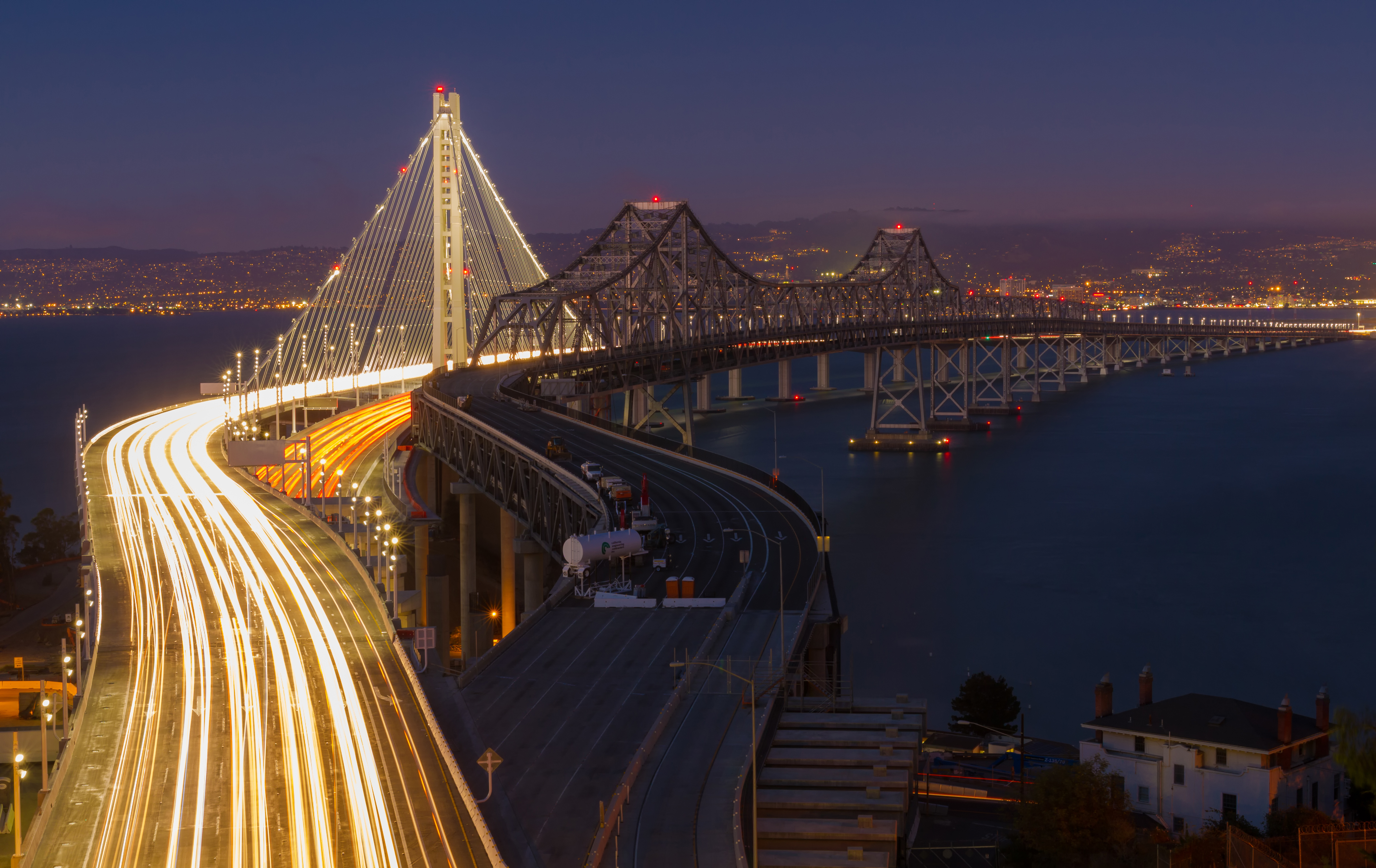
- View of original eastern span (right) and its replacement (left), just days after transfer of traffic
- Coordinates: 37.8168°N 122.3519°W
- Carries: 10 lanes of I-80, pedestrians and bicycles
- Crosses: San Francisco Bay east of Yerba Buena Island
- Locale: San Francisco Bay Area, San Francisco and Alameda counties, California, U.S.
- Official name: None
- Maintained by: California Department of Transportation (Caltrans)

Characteristics
- Design: Concrete-steel precast segment viaducts, dual steel orthotropic box beam self-anchored suspension main span, cast-in-place reinforced concrete transition connector
- Total length: 2.2 mi (3.5 km)
- Width: 258.33 ft (78.74 m)
- Height: 525 ft (160 m) (SAS)
- Longest span: 1,263 ft (385 m) (SAS)
- Load limit: 500,000
- Clearance above: Vehicles: N/A (Restricted to standard trucks by tunnel and other structures)
- Clearance below: 191 ft (58 m)
- No. of lanes: 10

History
- Construction start: January 29, 2002
- Construction end: September 2, 2013 (13 years ago)
- Construction cost: $6.5 Billion ($8.85 billion in 2025 dollars)
- Opened: September 2, 2013 10:15pm

Statistics
- Daily traffic: 270,000
- Toll: East span, westbound only; FasTrak or pay-by-plate, cash not accepted; Effective January 1 – December 31, 2025: $8.00; $4.00 (carpools during weekday peak hours, FasTrak only)

Location
- Interactive map of San Francisco–Oakland Bay Bridge (eastern span replacement)

The eastern span replacement of the San Francisco–Oakland Bay Bridge was a construction project to replace a seismically unsound portion of the Bay Bridge with a new self-anchored suspension bridge (SAS) and a pair of viaducts. The bridge is in the U.S. state of California and crosses San Francisco Bay between Yerba Buena Island and Oakland. The span replacement took place between 2002 and 2013, and is the most expensive public works project in California history, with a final price tag of $6.5 billion, a 2,500% increase from the original estimate of $250 million, which was an initial estimate for a seismic retrofit of the span, not the full span replacement ultimately completed. Originally scheduled to open in 2007, several problems delayed the opening until September 2, 2013. With a width of 258.33 ft (78.74 m), comprising 10 general-purpose lanes, it is the world's widest bridge according to Guinness World Records.

The Bay Bridge has two major sections: the western suspension spans and their approach structures between San Francisco and Yerba Buena Island and the structures between YBI and the eastern terminus in Oakland. The original eastern section was composed of a double balanced cantilever span, five through-truss spans, and a truss causeway. This part became the subject of concern after a section collapsed during the Loma Prieta earthquake on October 17, 1989. The replacement span is engineered to withstand the largest earthquake expected over a 1500-year period, and it is expected to last at least 150 years with proper maintenance.

== Background ==
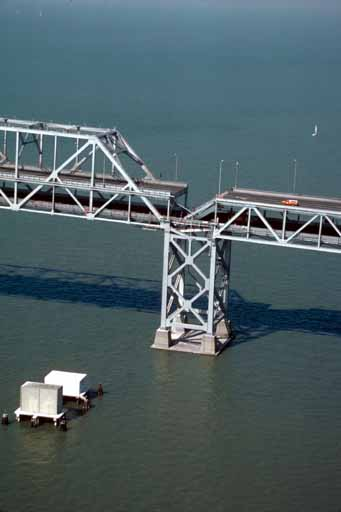
Collapsed section of roadbed visible above support tower immediately after the Loma Prieta earthquake in 1989

Bridge design experts had known for over 30 years that a major earthquake on either of two nearby faults (the San Andreas and the Hayward) could destroy the major cantilever span. Little was done to address this problem until the 1989 Loma Prieta earthquake. The earthquake measured 6.9 on the moment magnitude scale and while the epicenter was distant from the bridge, a 50-foot (15 m) section of the upper deck of the eastern truss viaduct portion of the bridge collapsed onto the deck below, indirectly resulting in one death at the point of collapse. The bridge was closed for a month as construction crews removed and reconstructed the fallen section. It reopened on November 18, 1989, with a new, stronger retrofit in place. The failure was at the transition between the easternmost through-truss and the westernmost double-deck causeway segment, a location where the inertial response character of the structure makes an abrupt change. Analysis of the event completed by internal staff has shown that the bridge was close to a far more catastrophic failure in which either the through-truss or the causeway segment would have dropped from their common support structure.

It was clear that the eastern span needed to be made more earthquake resistant. Estimates made in 1999 placed the probability of a major earthquake in the area within the following 30 years at 70%, although studies announced in September 2004 by the United States Geological Survey have cast doubt on the predictability of large earthquakes based upon the duration of preceding quiet periods. A more recent (2008) analysis asserts an increased probability of a major event on the Hayward Fault.

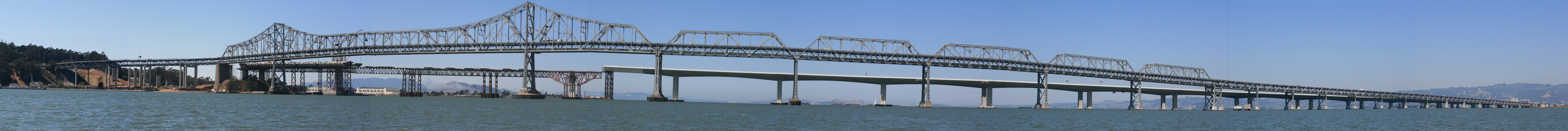
A 2010 view of the original eastern span in foreground with replacement construction beyond. All portions of the old eastern span were considered to be at risk in a large earthquake.

== Design proposals ==
=== Retrofit ===
The initial proposal for the eastern span involved the construction of substantial concrete columns to replace or supplement the existing supports. There would also be modifications to the lattice beams as are now complete for the western suspension spans. The original cost estimate for this refit was $200 million. The overall appearance would be little changed. Owing to the retention of the original structure, the bridge's ongoing maintenance costs would continue to be high. The robustness of a retrofit was called into question directly by the Army Corps of Engineers in a highly critical report and indirectly by the collapse of a retrofitted overpass in the 1994 Northridge earthquake in Los Angeles, that structure having been modified in response to the San Fernando earthquake 23 years prior.

=== Replacement ===
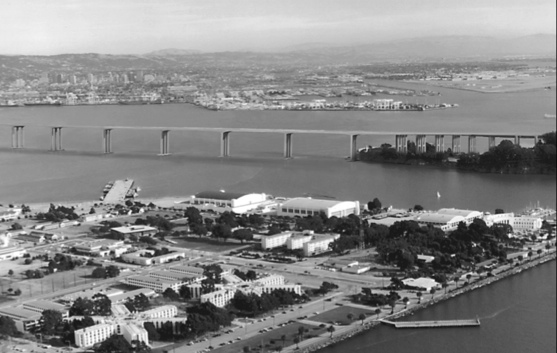
Artist's rendering of the basic viaduct-style span, also known as the "Skyway" design (1997)

Engineering and economic analysis in 1996 suggested that a replacement bridge would cost a few hundred million dollars more than a retrofit of the existing eastern span, would have a far longer expected useful life (perhaps 75 to 100 years rather than 30), and would require far less maintenance. Rather than retrofit the existing bridge, CalTrans (California Department of Transportation) decided to replace the entire eastern span due to cost savings of approximately $625 million, minimize scheduling impact to traffic, improved safety, and additional amenities compared to retrofit. The design proposed was an elevated viaduct consisting of reinforced concrete columns and precast concrete segment spans as seen in the illustration at right. The design criterion was that the new bridge should survive an 8.5 magnitude earthquake on any of several faults in the region (particularly the nearby San Andreas and Hayward faults). The aesthetics of the proposal were not well received by either the public or their politicians, being characterized as a "freeway on stilts".

Original and final eastern span "signature" bridge proposal

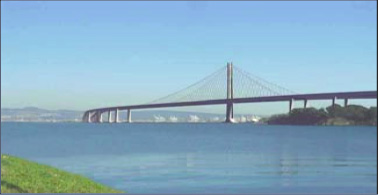
Artistic rendition of the accepted design as seen from Treasure Island after removal of the original span (ca. 2018)

After this, a design contest was held for a signature span (a span with distinctive and dramatic appearance, unique to the site) by the Engineering and Design Advisory Panel (EDAP) of the Metropolitan Transportation Commission (MTC). A number of innovative proposals were examined until all but four proposals that were submitted by members of EDAP were selected as semi-finalists, and a winner was selected from this group. This posed a serious conflict of interest, as members of the EDAP who were selecting the bridge design reviewed proposals by their own firms and rejected all proposals that did not have a representative on the EDAP. The design chosen was more expensive than the alternatives, because the primary structure cannot be self-supporting until it is structurally complete. This requires the building of two bridges, the first a falsework to support the final span, which would be removed upon completion of the final span. It has also been criticized as both a less structurally robust design and with less predictable construction costs than other modern spans.

==== Alignment ====
In 1997, there was much political bickering over whether the bridge should be built to the north or to the south of the existing bridge, with the "Mayors Brown" (San Francisco's Willie Brown and Oakland's Jerry Brown) on opposite sides of the issue. Yerba Buena Island is within the city limits of San Francisco and the proposed (and current) northern alignment would cast a shadow over certain prime development sites on the island's eastern shore. Even the U.S. Navy (at the time the controlling authority of the island) was involved at the behest of San Francisco in restricting Caltrans soil engineers' access to the proposed site. That may have caused up to a two-year delay and many hundred millions of dollars in additional costs.

Various options were determined to be worthy of consideration and were carefully examined jointly by state and federal authorities, with input from the United States Coast Guard.

Grade alternatives included:

- Extending the sea level approach grade westward, with a steep approach to the span.
- Using a relatively constant grade, including on a portion of the span.
- Using a relatively constant grade to near the span, with the span level.

The last alternative was chosen because it was considered to have a superior visual effect and improved driving experience. The grade of the new approach (estimated possible ranges of 1.710%-1.779%; vertically-curved suspension deck with crest, slightly different from what was chosen) to the channel span is somewhat less than that of the previous structure (exactly 4% for ground-upper deck connection; exactly 2.74% for deck trusses and east 2 through trusses; transition gradient for center through truss; exactly 1.3% for cantilever arms and west 2 through trusses; vertical curve with crest between cantilever towers) and less ship clearance is provided under the span owing mostly to the depth of the deck box structures.

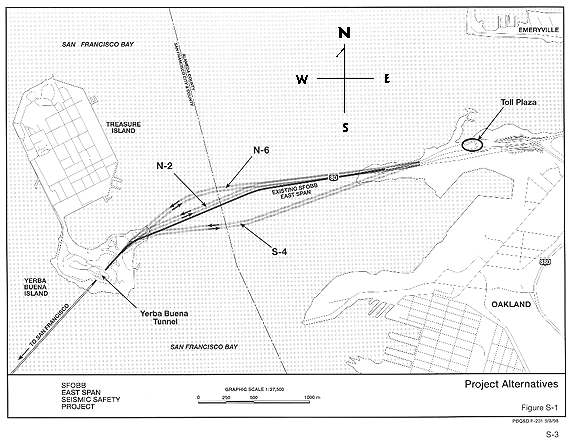
Alignment alternatives in 1998

Alignment alternatives included (see image at right for details):

- S4: a southern alignment, slightly curved, but a shorter route than the northern alternatives.
- N2: a two-bend northern alignment close to the existing bridge.
- N4: a single bend alignment, with the main span tending northward to the curve to the eastern approach viaducts, those being parallel to the existing double-deck truss causeway approach.

The last alternative was selected, as it presents a superior view of San Francisco to the west compared to the others where views are obscured by Yerba Buena Island. Any more northerly track would encounter more difficult geotechnical circumstances.

=== Naming proposal ===
In December 2004, the San Francisco Board of Supervisors, in honor of Joshua A. Norton, passed a resolution "urging the California Department of Transportation and members of the California Assembly and Senate to name the new additions to the San Francisco Bay Bridge in honor of Emperor Norton I, Emperor of the United States and Protector of Mexico." The proposal was not supported by the Oakland City Council and the bridge does not have an official name.

== Bidding and initial construction ==
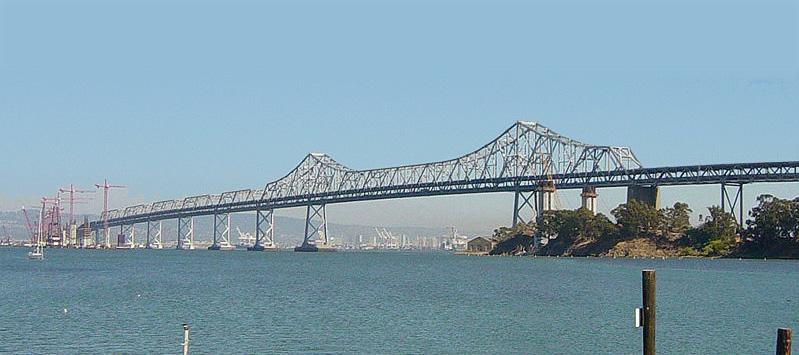
Construction on the skyway in progress at left in 2004, with main span counterweight support columns in place at right of center

Although it was somewhat controversial, authorities decided to allow bids to include major components and materials not made in the United States. This was partly due to the cost of materials, and especially due to the lack of suitable fabrication facilities within the United States, or even within the western hemisphere. In contrast, China, where the SAS deck components (including the massive cable, key sections of the iconic tower and deck) were built by Shanghai Zhenhua Heavy Industries Company, has low cost materials producers. Other major components were produced in Japan, owing to the availability of large steel casting, welding, and machining capabilities. Suspender saddles were made in England. As Federal highway funds generally come with "Made in America" restrictions, the bridge was built without such funds, for which it would otherwise qualify owing to its carriage of Interstate 80.

The authorities were shocked when they opened the bids on the proposed tower portion and only a single bid for US$1.4 billion was received, considerably more than their estimate of around $780 million. This was partially because of a rise in the cost of steel and concrete, particularly as a result of the concurrent building boom in China, but also due to construction uncertainties owing to the innovative design. The entire project, requiring 100,000 tons of structural steel, was expected to cost $6.2 billion as of July 2005, up from a 1997 estimate of $1.1 billion (for a simple viaduct) and a March 2003 estimate of $2.6 billion that included a tower span. Despite the increase in costs, construction began on the replacement on January 29, 2002, with completion originally slated for 2007. The span finally opened on September 2, 2013.

=== Removal of signature span ===
On September 30, 2004, the office of Governor Arnold Schwarzenegger announced that, without sufficient funds authorized by the California Legislature, the bid must be allowed to expire. It was, at the time, unclear if this would require a redesign to obtain a less expensive span.

Six alternative proposals from 2004

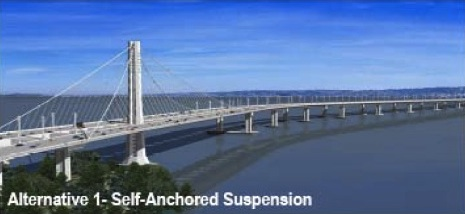
1: Self Anchored Suspension (all steel)

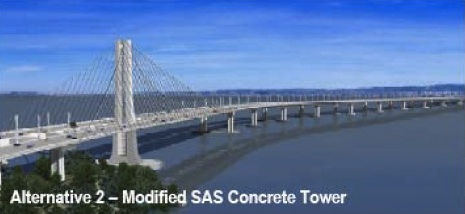
2: Modified SAS Concrete Tower

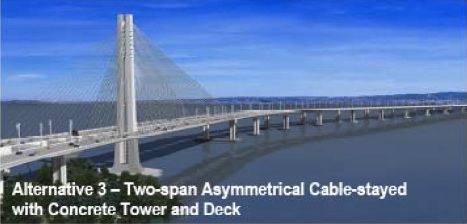
3: Two-span Asymmetrical Cable-stayed (concrete)
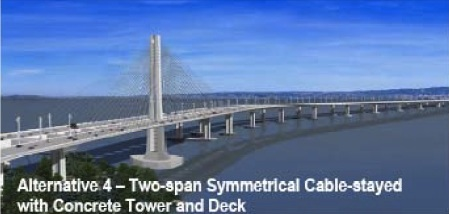
4: Two-span Symmetrical Cable-stayed (concrete)

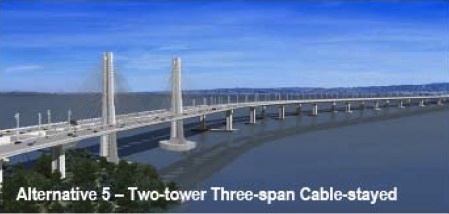
5: Two-tower Three-span Cable-Stayed (concrete)

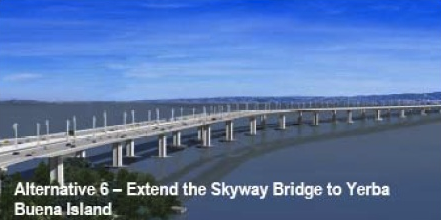
6: Extend the Skyway Bridge to YBI

On December 10, 2004, the governor's office announced that the signature span concept had been scrapped, with the bridge to be the simple viaduct originally proposed. The design, having gone full circle, remained expensive due to the continued high cost of materials. Many argued that there would be little difference in final cost with this lesser proposal since that concept required obtaining new permits, perhaps adding another two or three years; furthermore, a viaduct may not even be able to obtain Coast Guard approval, since the maximum width of the ship channel would be reduced by almost half. Local reaction to this announcement was intense, with most suggesting that the bridge be built to appear as proposed — either in the steel material as bid or using a reinforced concrete tower of similar appearance but of lower cost.

=== Reinstatement of original design ===
The standpoint of pro-"signature bridge" activists and regional politicians was reinforced by a legislative analyst's report in late January 2005. The report indicated, due to additional time delays and all new permitting requirements, that the governor's viaduct proposal could likely cost additional funding and take longer to complete than the proposed signature span. This view was reinforced by a further report in March 2005 indicating that the delay imposed by the governor had already added at least $100 million to the expected cost (subsequently modified to $83 million in a December 2005 report).

The design controversy continued for over six months. In essence, the governor believed that the entire state should not share in the costs of building the bridge, as he considered it to be a local problem. Northern Californians pointed out that when the southern portions of the state experienced disasters, the state supported rebuilding, especially as seen in earthquake rebuilding of freeways and the subsequent seismic retrofit of state freeway structures and bridges. Since the objective of the replacement of the eastern span is to prevent the necessity of complete rebuilding after a large earthquake, Bay Area residents felt justified in their call for state support.

A compromise was announced on June 24, 2005 by Governor Schwarzenegger. The governor said that he and State Senate President Pro Tempore Don Perata had reached agreement to resurrect plans for the signature span. Cost estimates of the contract deferral expenses and inflation range attributable to the delay have ranged up to $400 million. Direct costs due to cessation of work included some dismantling of temporary structures and their reconstruction upon the subsequent restart.

After being approved by the legislature, the compromise legislation authored by Senator Loni Hancock was signed by the governor on July 18, 2005. The compromise called for the state to contribute $630 million to help cover the $3.6 billion in cost overruns, and bridge tolls to be raised to $4 starting in 2007. At the time of the signing, the skyway portion of the bridge was 75 percent complete and the state was beginning to prepare to put the suspension span out for new bids. The entire project was then scheduled to be completed in 2013 at an estimated cost of $6.3 billion, not counting the demolition of the old span.

In January 2006, costs for the main structure steelwork were determined to be $400 million in excess of these expectations. New bids for the main span were opened on March 22, 2006, with two submissions at 1.43 and US$1.6 billion. Owing to reserves built up with a $3.00 toll during the delay, it was initially suggested by authorities that additional tolls exceeding $4.00 would not be required, but due to added costs in other portions due to the delay and the cost of restarting the main span foundation work, an eventual toll of $5.00 is now expected. (The toll is only collected in the westbound direction.) The low bid by a joint venture of American Bridge and Fluor Corp., named 'American Bridge-Fluor', was accepted on April 19, 2006.

== Design and construction ==
=== Skyway Viaduct ===
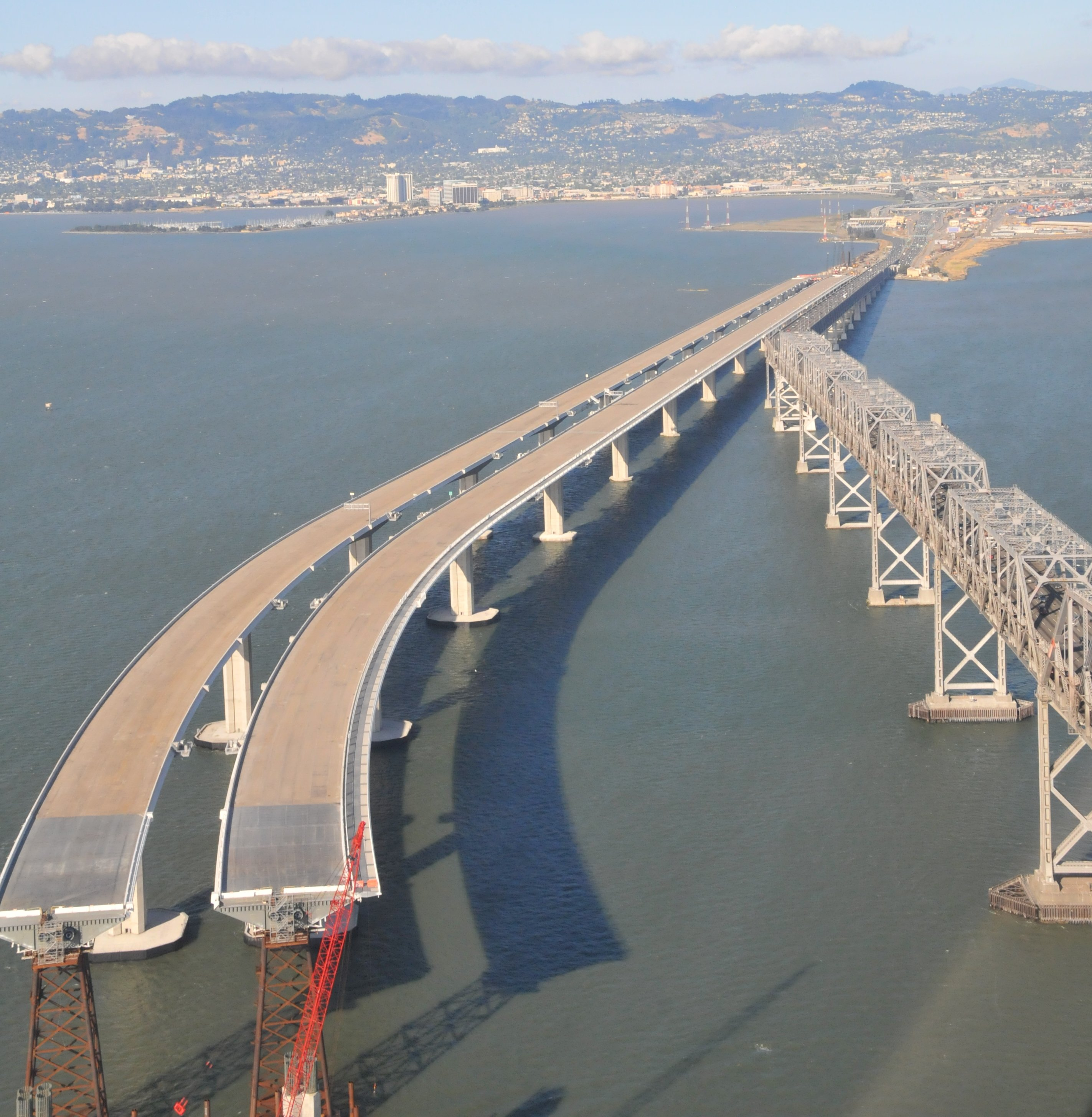
New and old approach spans (May 2008)

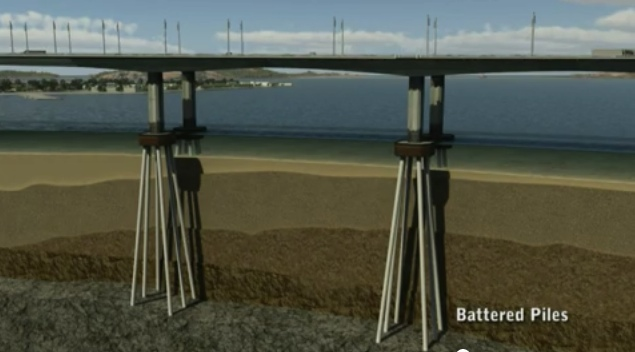
Cutaway illustration, showing battered piles that support the skyway

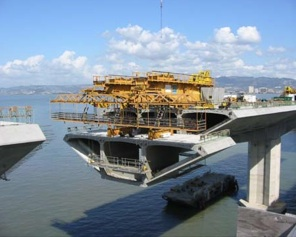
700-ton segment lift

The skyway viaduct connects the SAS portion of the bridge with the Oakland shore. By 2007, 75 percent of the skyway portion was completed. Since this section crosses the shallower portion of the bay, the foundations were constructed within sheet-pile cofferdams. By mid-2009, the final connection of the viaduct portion with ground level at the eastern end was being finished and the pedestrian walkway was being attached to the completed sections.

Rather than set pilings deep enough to reach bedrock, the pilings are founded in firm archaic mud below the soft mud deposited by distant placer mining in the late 19th century. Since even the archaic mud is too weak in this concentrated load application for conventional vertical friction piles, large diameter tubular piles were driven (inside the pumped-dry cofferdams) at angles, forming a "battered" (splayed) footing, through the archaic mud into the firm aggregated sand, mud, and gravel of the Alameda formation. Where long pilings were needed, segments were welded together as completed segments were installed.

When all pilings were in place, a reinforced concrete pad was poured at the bottom of the cofferdam to form a footing for the column, subsequently cast in place around rebar using reusable metal formwork.

A single viaduct segment located over each column was cast in place using forms. Pairs of precast span segments, fabricated in Stockton, were barged to the location and lifted into place with a specialized cantilever lift. (Cantilever lifts, counterweights and other equipment and materials were lifted either by a barge crane or by a jack-up crane located between adjacent columns.) Once in the proper location, the opposing segments could then be joined with through tendons (cables within conduits that are tensioned with jacks), forming a balanced cantilever over the column. Eventually, the gap in spans between columns was closed, forming a tendon-reinforced beam.

The Oakland Touchdown is a curved elevated roadway that connects the skyway to the Oakland shore (the beginning of the bridge). The curve is required to bring the alignment to that of the existing ground-level approach road. Like the Yerba Buena Island Transition Structure (YBITS) to the west of the main span, this section is also an end segment of the new bridge and is being constructed at the same pace as the YBITS. The construction process consists of two phases, the first phase already completed (westbound traffic side). The eastbound touchdown could not be completed until the existing roadway was out of the way. This was done by constructing a gentle swing to the south so that the touchdown may be completed. The first stage of this work was to move the eastbound traffic to the south was completed with only minor traffic delays during the 2011 Memorial Day holiday (May 28–30). The driving experience has been improved, without the problems that came with the infamous S-curve. A second stage to move the westbound traffic into the space made available required the construction of an elevated approach. This was completed on February 19, 2012. This recently designed procedure is expected to save time in the total effort, speeding the completion of the span. The Oakland Touchdown was completed in March 2013.

On the three-day weekend beginning 8:00 P.M. Friday, February 17, 2012, the westbound lanes were shut down to allow the connection of the approach roadbed with the new temporary structure. The execution of this task was dependent upon weather, dry conditions being required for re-striping the lanes, and it was not determined until a few days before that the work would be done on this weekend. Originally scheduled for completion by 5:00 A.M. on Tuesday, February 21, the work was completed 34 hours ahead of schedule, and opened to traffic at approximately 7:15 P.M. on Sunday, February 19.

=== Main span ===
The principal span is of a seldom-built type, a self-anchored suspension (SAS) bridge. It is unique in being both single tower and asymmetrical, a design tailored to the site. For ship channel clearance, the bridge would require at least one long span, while ready access to bedrock was found only close to Yerba Buena Island. A two tower cable-stayed design would require very deep tower footings, and a conventional two tower suspension bridge would additionally require a massive anchor to be built in deep bay mud. The curved nature of the approach and seismic safety criteria place additional constraints upon the design, which set many firsts for a SAS bridge.

While earlier bridges of this type use chain eyebars, the long span needed here uses wire cable, like other modern suspension bridges. Uniquely, this is a single loop of cable rather than the usual pair of cables, and, rather than being spun in place above the catwalks, substantial bundles of strands were dragged into place with temporary support above the catwalks, eventually suspended by tensioning the strand. These strand bundles were then arranged to be finally compacted to form the completed main cable.

Elevation and plan: height 160 metres (520 ft), length 624.385 metres (2,048.51 ft)
(Not shown above, the cable is continuous across the western (W2), leftmost end.)
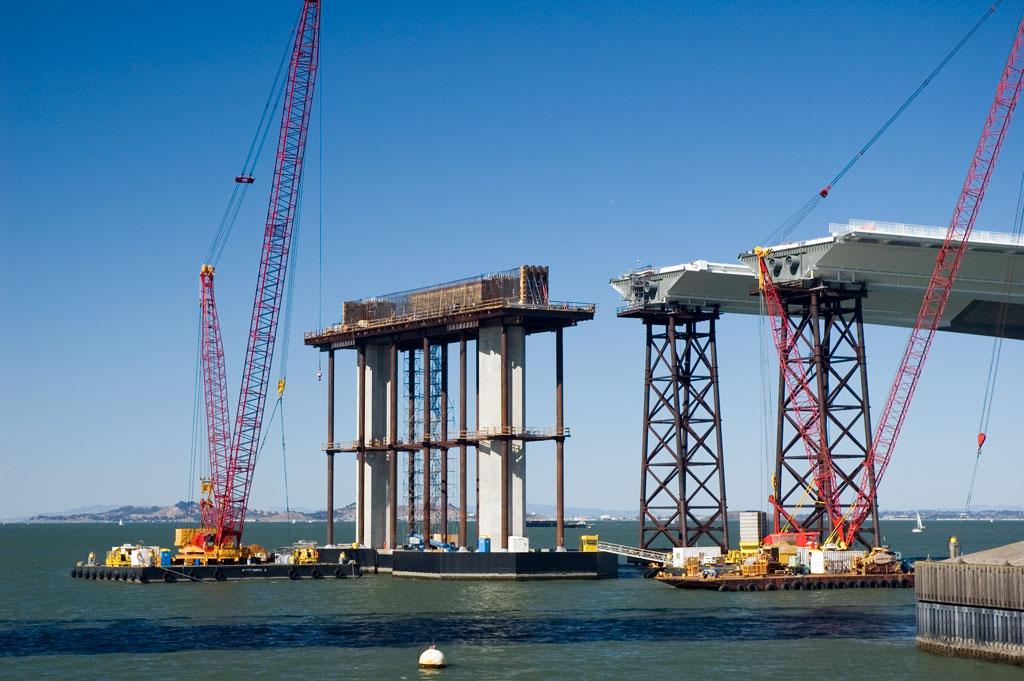
Eastern end (E2): The main cable strands will be anchored within the deck structure near here. This light structure is insufficient as an anchorage for a conventional suspension span. Instead, the tensile forces of the main cable are resisted by compressive forces in the main span deck box structure. (Image fall 2008, others in this section spring 2011)

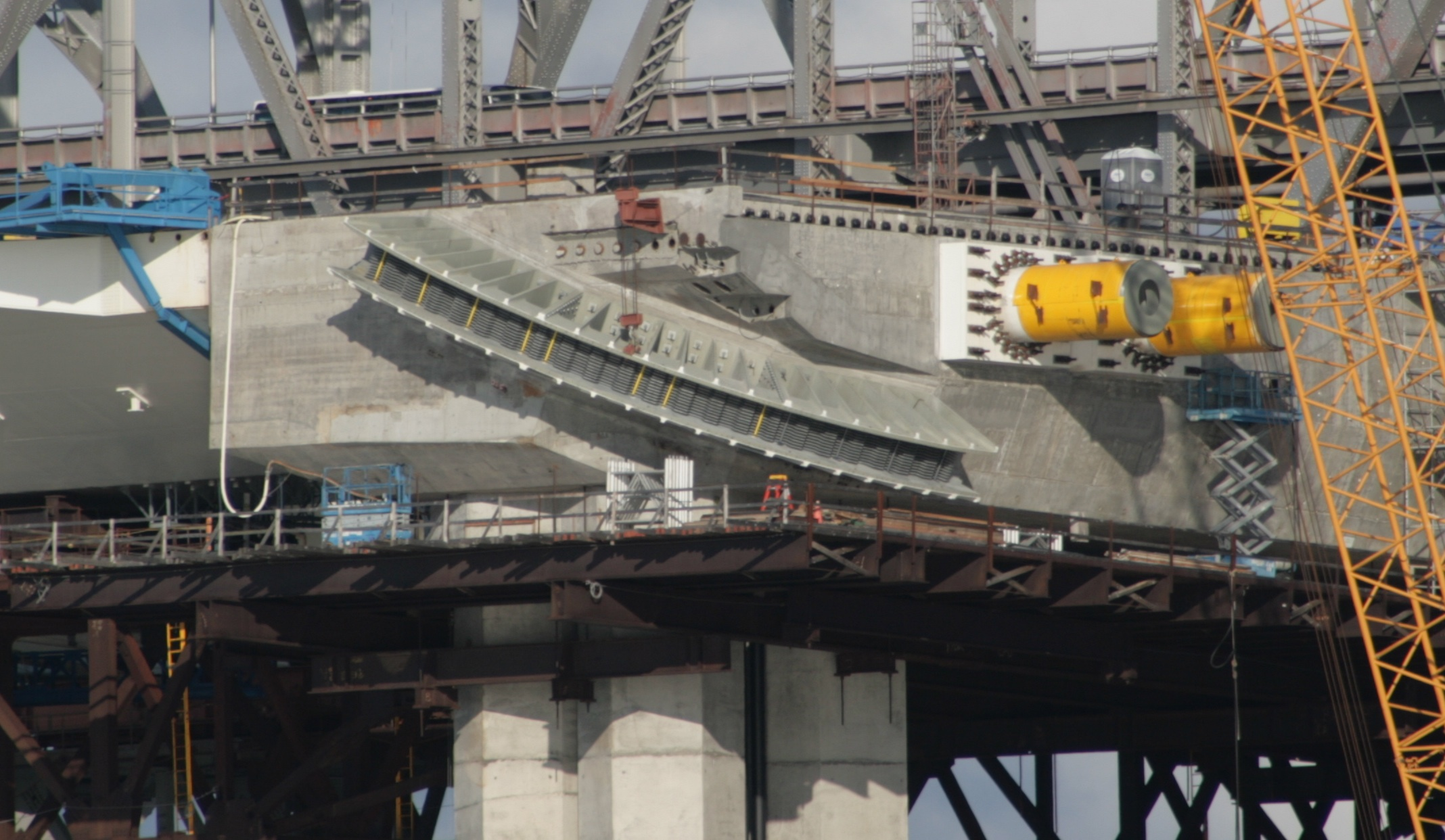
Northwest corner (W2): 90-degree deviation (turning) saddle for the main cable. sacrificial tubular end keys (yellow) will maintain alignment with the transition structure

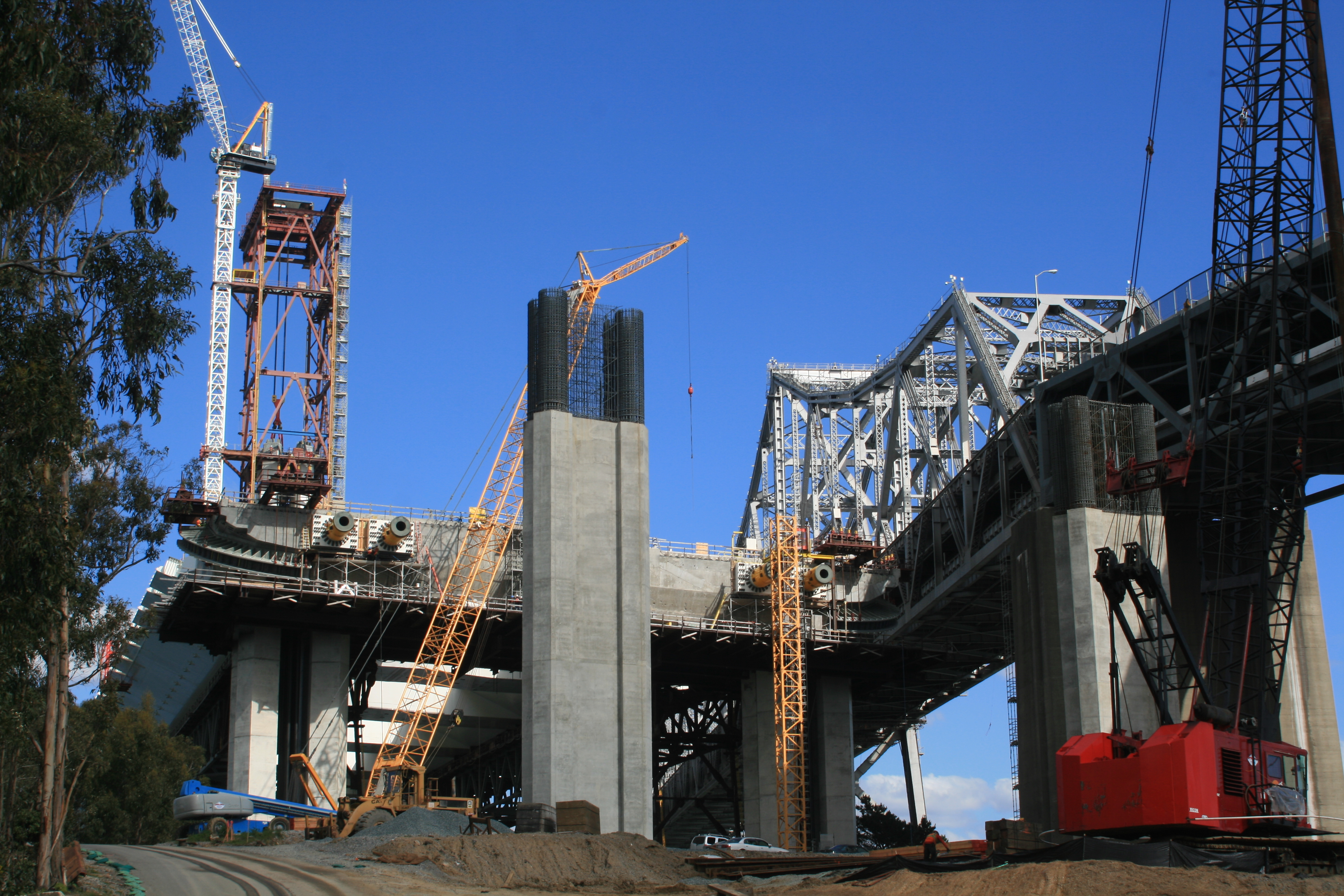
Western end (W2): Western end counterweight, behind (YBITS) approach structure columns, SAS Tower (T1) scaffold/gantry beyond. On the right is the 1936 bridge.

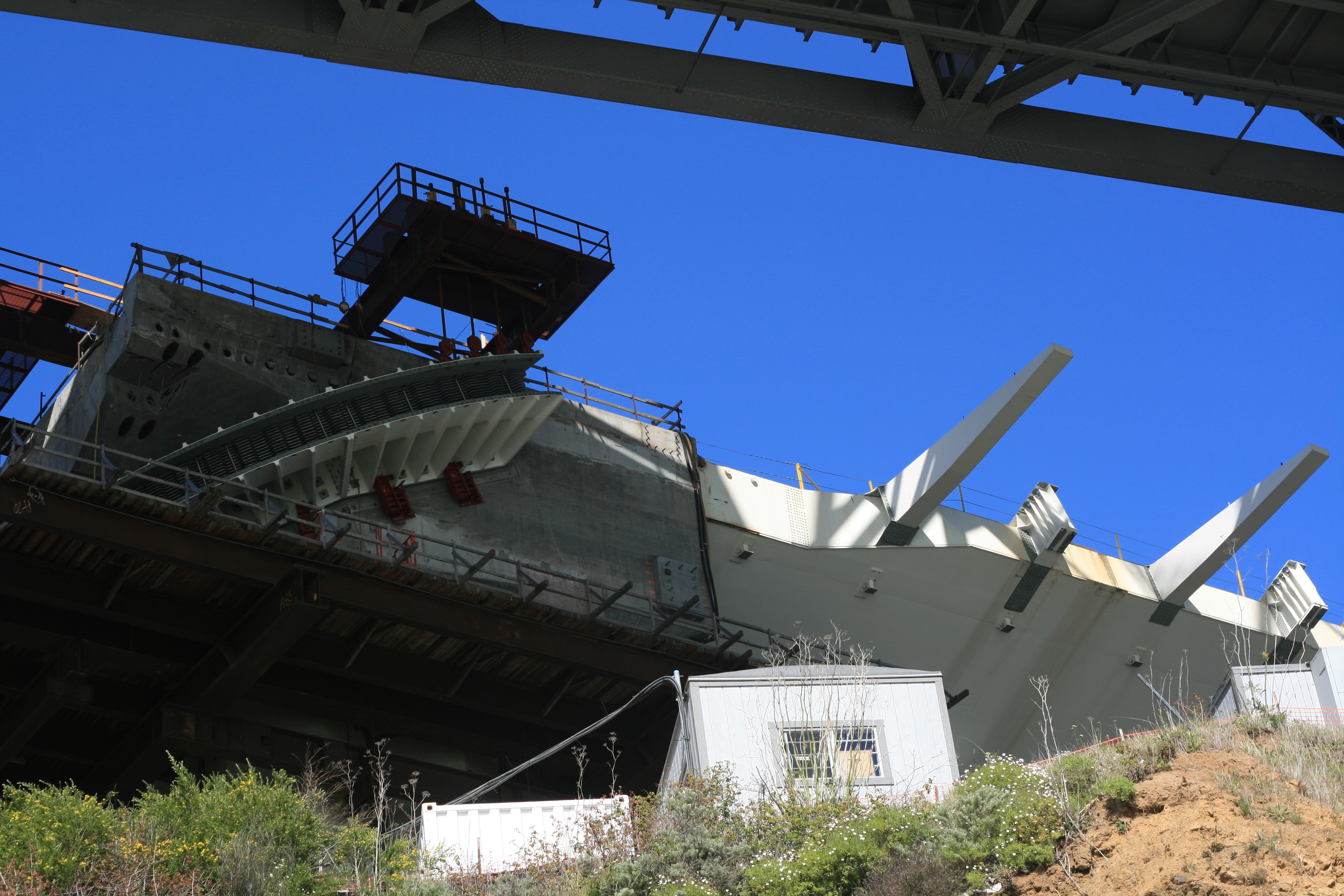
Southwest corner (W2): South side of western concrete end cap/counterweight, westernmost southern deck box to right with alternating walkway-support struts and suspender-cable terminations

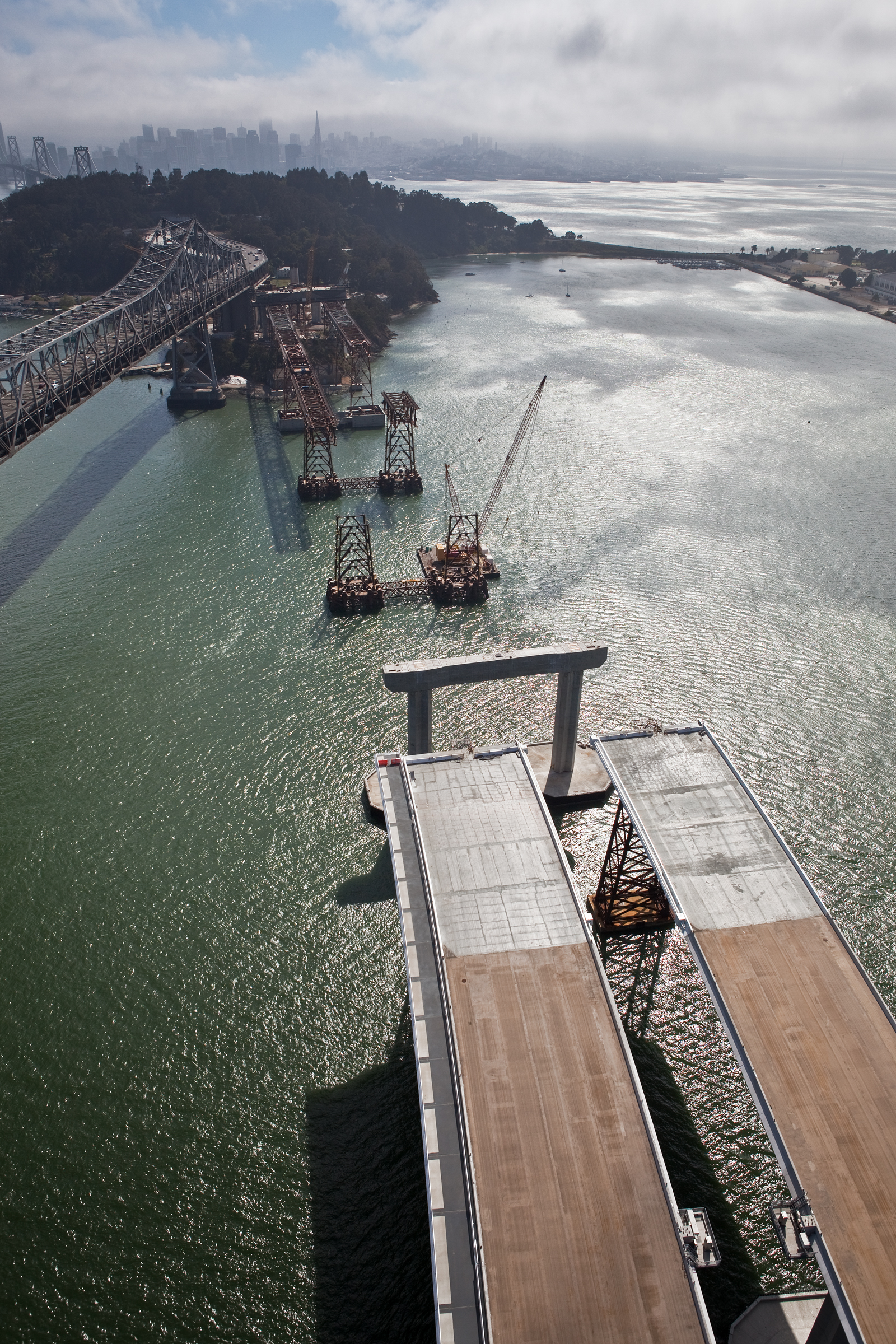
July 31, 2009: First eastern main span support (E2), with partial truss falsework beyond

Being asymmetrical, the shorter western span must be pulled down against the forces imposed by the longer eastern span. To avoid vertical uplift in the supporting columns (W2), the uplift at pier W2 is fully counterbalanced by a massive concrete end weight, which also carries the turning saddles for the main cables. As seen in the northwest corner image above, there is an upward component to the tension force provided by the main cable, and it is this component that removes most of the weight of the end cap from its columns. (The greater, horizontal, component is countered by the compressive forces exerted by the deck box girders, as is characteristic of this type of bridge.)

The segments of each of the two deck spans will be retained in compression during a severe earthquake by post-tensioned internal tendons joining the extreme end caps, carried internally in cable trays. These tendons are required since the eastern end support is both much lighter than the western counterweight and the soil conditions are radically different at each end, the western end being founded in bedrock shale while the eastern end, with vertical supports driven to bedrock, is mostly contained within softer mud deposits, which respond much more actively to seismic shocks than does the shale. The intent is that the combination of the tensioned tendons and the compressive roadbed box structure will keep the two end caps in the same relative position.

The bridge segments at each end are not simple repetitions of the central span segments. The extreme deck segments on the eastern end are curved and tilted to fair into the curved portion of the skyway. These extreme segments are also beyond the main cable strand anchors and the eastern support columns and a substantial portion of the bridge joining the skyway is already in place (the grey portion seen above). The extreme east bound deck segments on the western end must fair with the horizontal eastbound portion of the YBITS connector, while the westbound (north side) segments begin a rise to the westbound YBITS, elevating traffic to the upper deck of the Yerba Buena tunnel.

==== S-curve construction ====
The old cantilever bridge was connected to the Yerba Buena tunnel with a double-deck truss causeway that included a curved section. As this structure occupied an area that must be clear for the new bridge approach, it was necessary to construct an entirely new, temporary approach to the old bridge. This was required to swing to the south to clear the area for new construction, and then back to the north with a more severe curve to connect to the unilever. As there would only be a few days available during which the bridge could be shut to traffic, the curved portion was built adjacent to its final position on a trestle that extended beneath and beyond the old curved connector. During replacement, the old section was jacked out of the way (to the north), and the new section jacked into place.

S-curve images

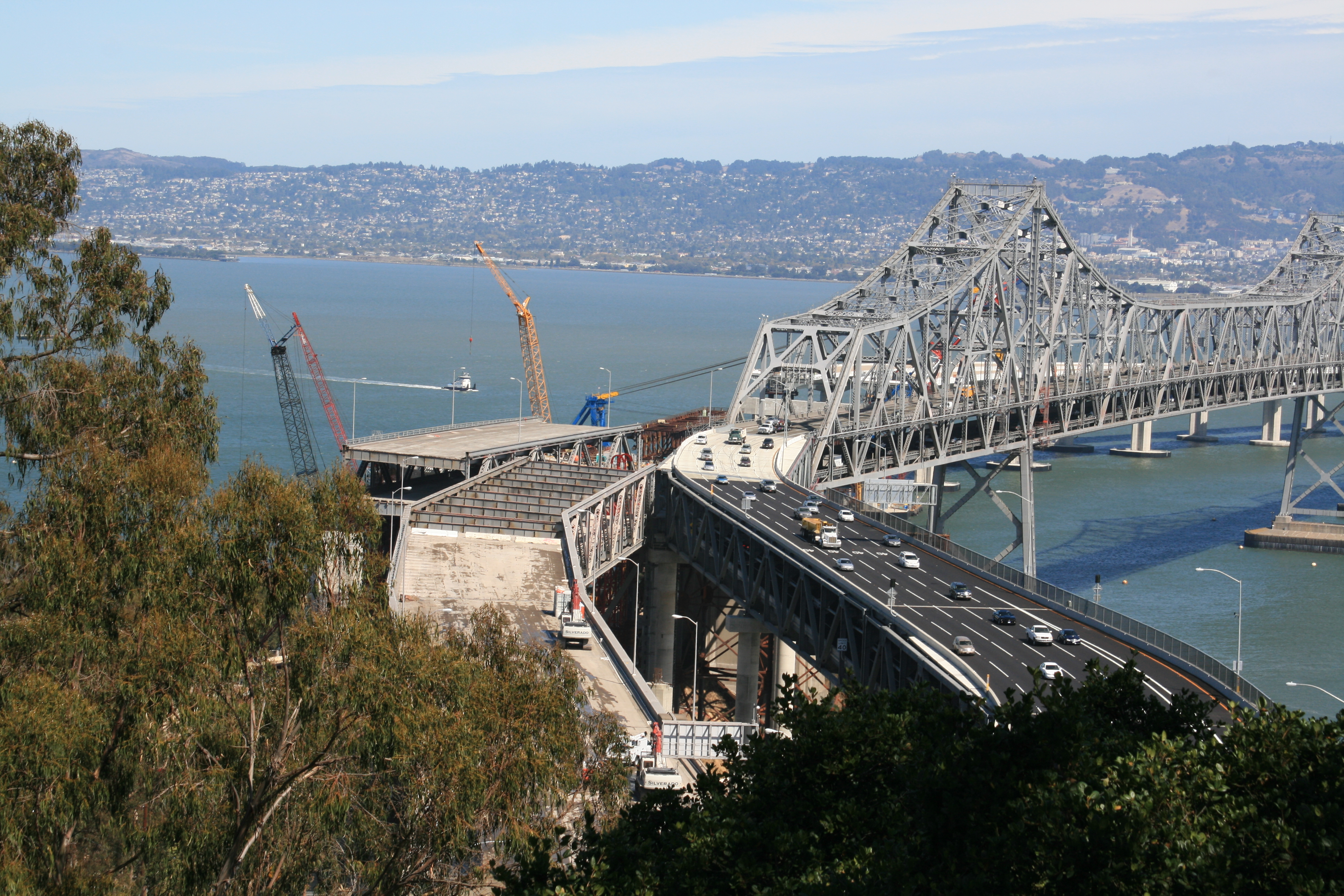
September 29, 2009: New S-connector with traffic, white section replaced translated original segment to its left, remainder of original section is partially dismantled, to be replaced with a permanent transition structure to the new bridge. Viewpoint is near the U.S. Coast Guard harbor control center above the Yerba Buena tunnel.

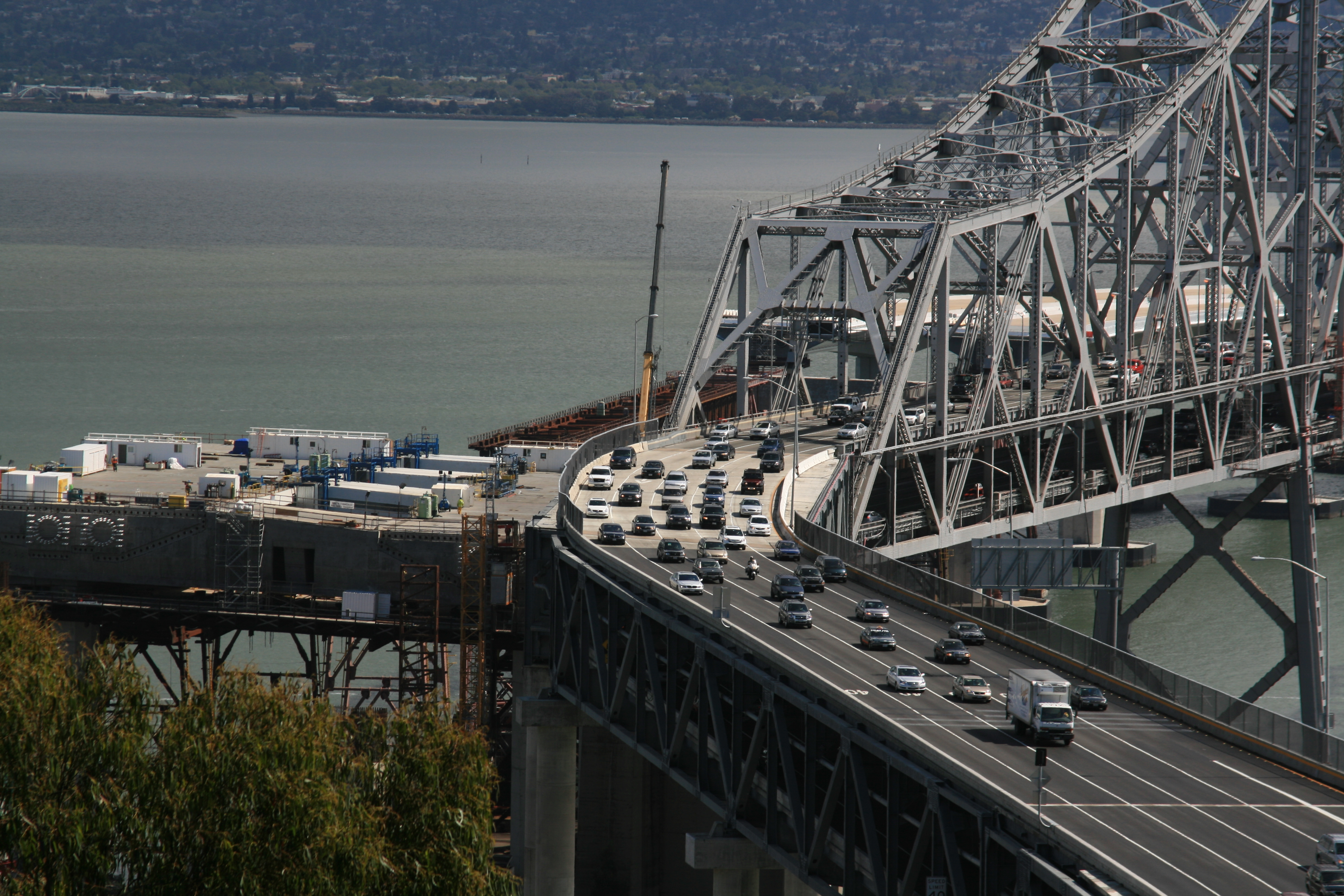
April 20, 2010: At the S-connector the remainder of original section is now dismantled and the main span counterweight is in place. Main span sections are being placed upon the falsework truss structure.

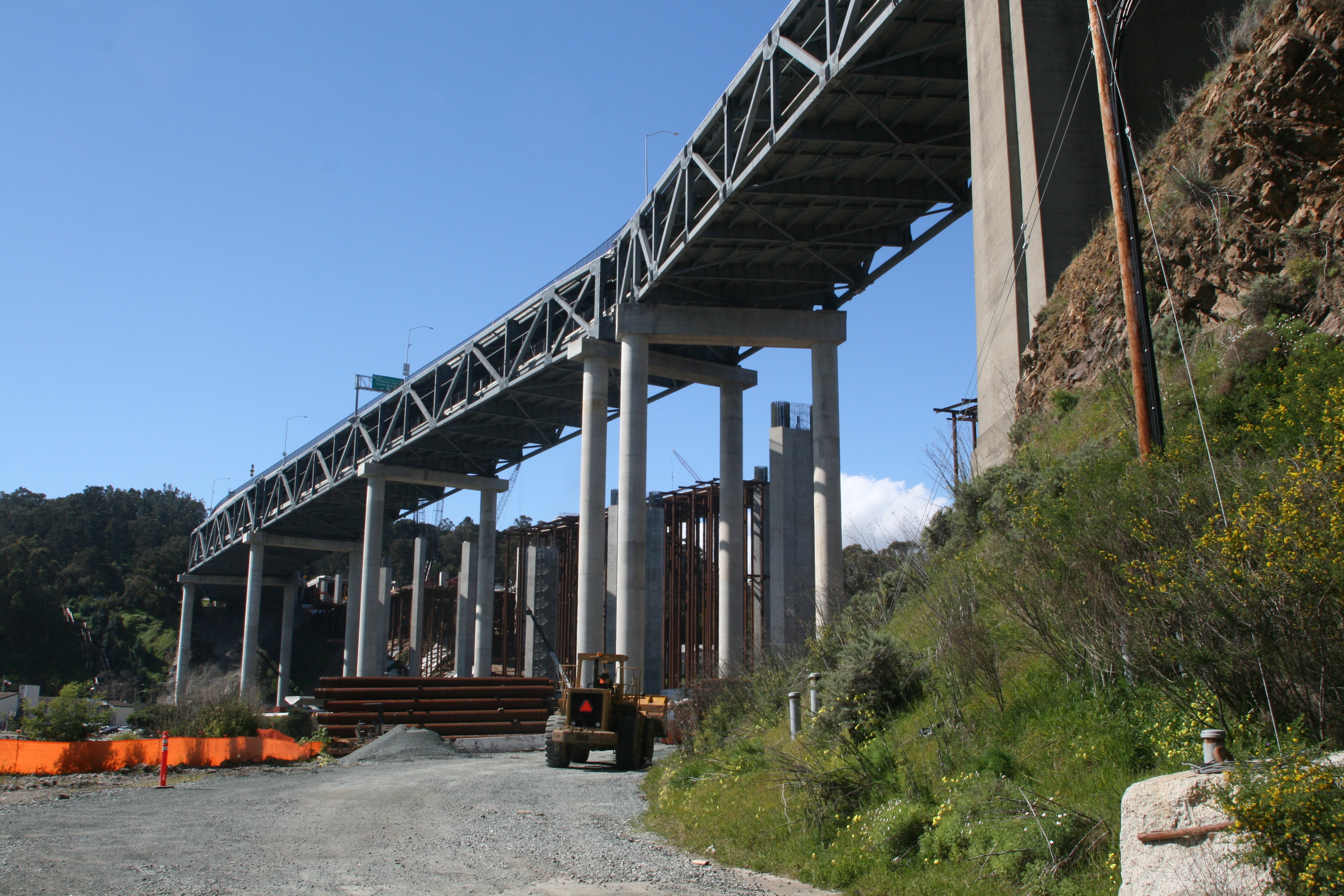
February 28, 2011: Underpinnings of the S-connector with permanent columns and falsework beyond.

On September 3, 2007, the first section associated with the construction of the new East Span, the 300-foot (91 m) temporary span connecting the main cantilever section to the Yerba Buena Island Tunnel, was put into service. Construction of the new connector span started in early 2007 alongside the existing span. Caltrans closed the Bay Bridge during the Labor Day weekend so crews could replace the old span. Once the old section was removed, the new span was rolled into place using a computer-guided system of hydraulic jacks and rollers. The new section was secured into place and the bridge re-opened 11 hours ahead of schedule, for the morning commute on September 4, 2007. In September 2009, during a single holiday closure, new temporary steelwork to route traffic around the location of the final approaches to the new bridge was put in place, and its connections to the tunnel exit and the existing bridge were completed, much as was done in September 2007. This bypass enabled the construction of the permanent transition structure between the double-deck tunnel exit and the new side-by-side bridge structure. Upon completion of the bridge, another extended closure allowed the removal of the temporary structure and the completion of the road link.

The S-curve became well known for accidents, from fender-benders to a fatal plunge. Wrecks typically occurred during non-commute times, when traffic flows faster, at or above the general bridge limit of 50 mph. Additional signage and visual and physical indicators indicating the 40 mph S-curve speed limit were installed following a major accident. The upper deck speed advisory at the curve was posted as 35 mph and an improved system of "rumble strips" was installed.

==== SAS falsework ====
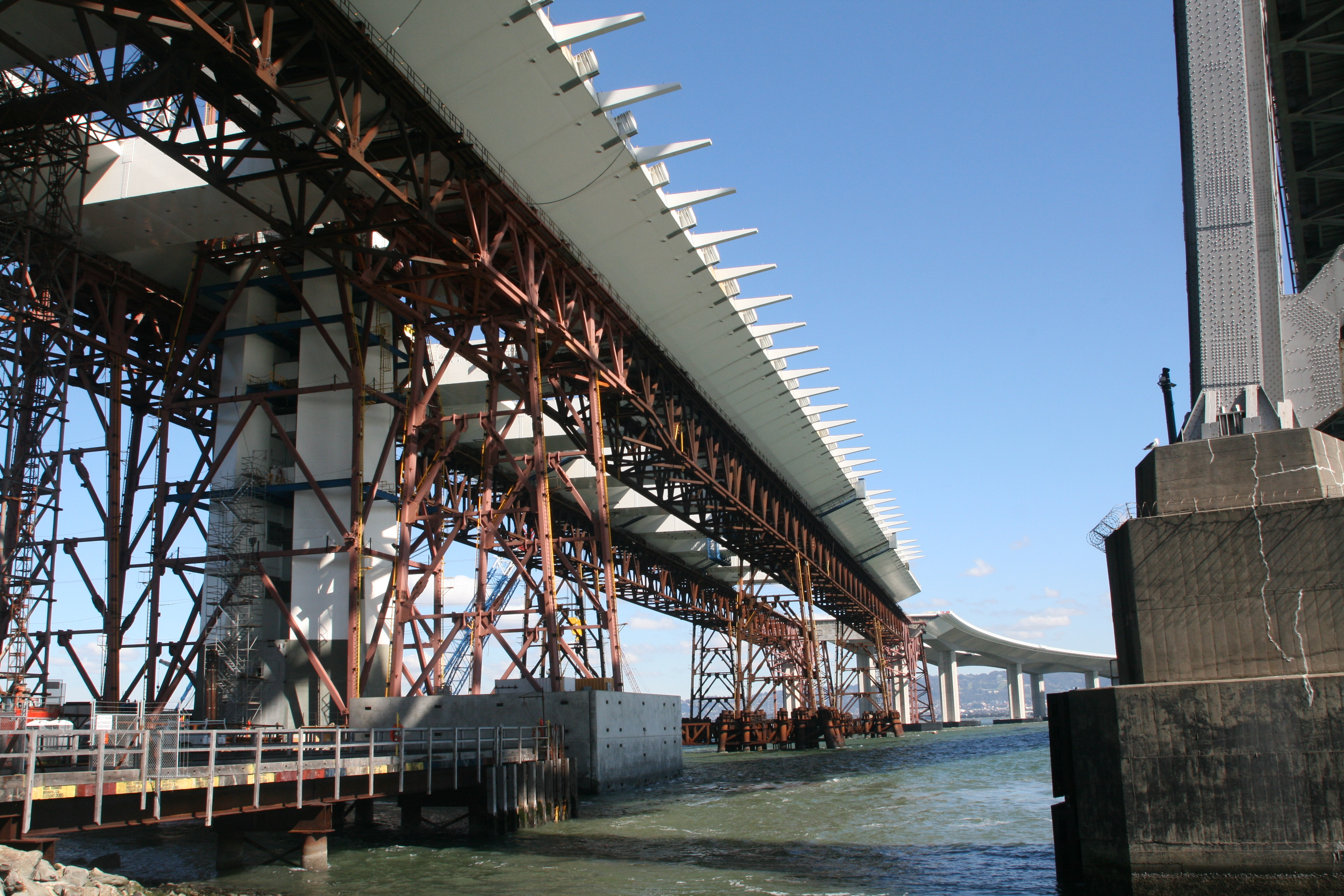
Falsework parallel truss bridges temporarily supporting deck segment box structures

The entire deck structure must be supported in precise alignment until:

- The end caps with anchors and turning and tensioning saddles are complete.
- The tower with its main cable saddle is complete.
- All deck segments are in place and joined.
- The internal tendons are placed and tensioned.
- The main cable is spun.
- All suspender cables are in place and adjusted for tension.
- The main cable tension is balanced on each side. (This is maintained as the suspender cables are tensioned.)

The falsework to perform this task is a pair of substantial truss bridges, prefabricated in segments, with columns and span segments lifted into place by barge cranes. The trusses are supported on foundations consisting of or built atop deeply driven piles. Upon completion of the bridge, the entire falsework structure and all exposed underwater supports will be removed to make a safe channel for deep draft ships transiting to and from the Port of Oakland.

==== Deck placement ====
By late August 2009, the temporary column work was complete, truss spans were in place and prefabricated sections were being placed upon it. A giant barge crane, the Left Coast Lifter, was used to place the 28 main deck box structures. Major segment placement on the SAS section of the bridge was completed in early October 2011. On October 19, 2011, the small gap between the SAS deck and the curved skyway extension was finally closed for the east-bound side, and the west-bound gap was closed the following week. By November 2011, the deck placement of the SAS span was complete, making 1½ miles of continuous roadway.

In July 2013, the entire SAS span was completed and asphalt paving for the roadway began. Each deck segment is paved with two single-inch layers of asphalt and concrete which should be very durable and last for the entire lifetime of the bridge. However, the rest of the bridge is not paved with asphalt but instead only received a protective coating finish.

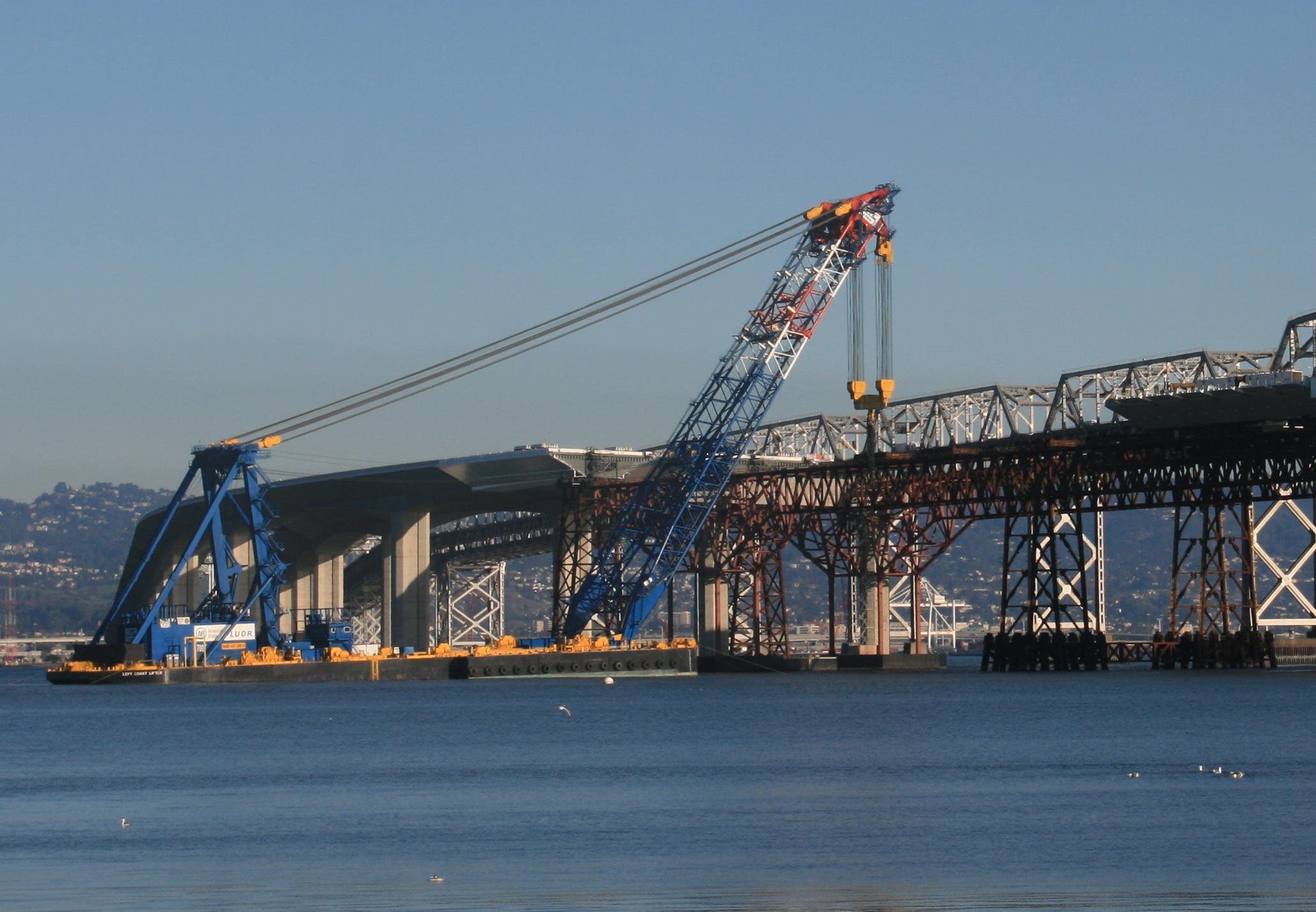
Left Coast Lifter onsite, January 4, 2011.

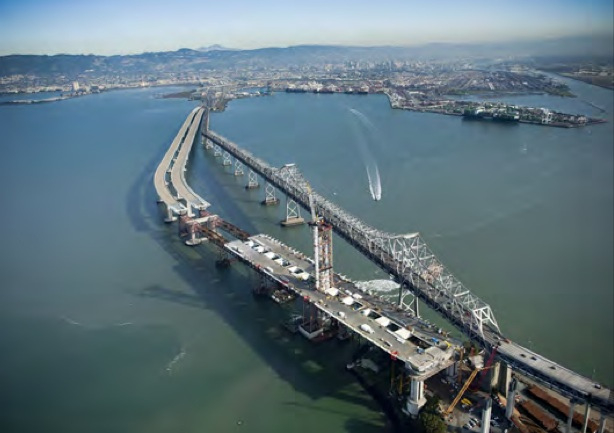
Partial deck installation, late 2010. Note: the deck structure does not touch the tower structure directly.
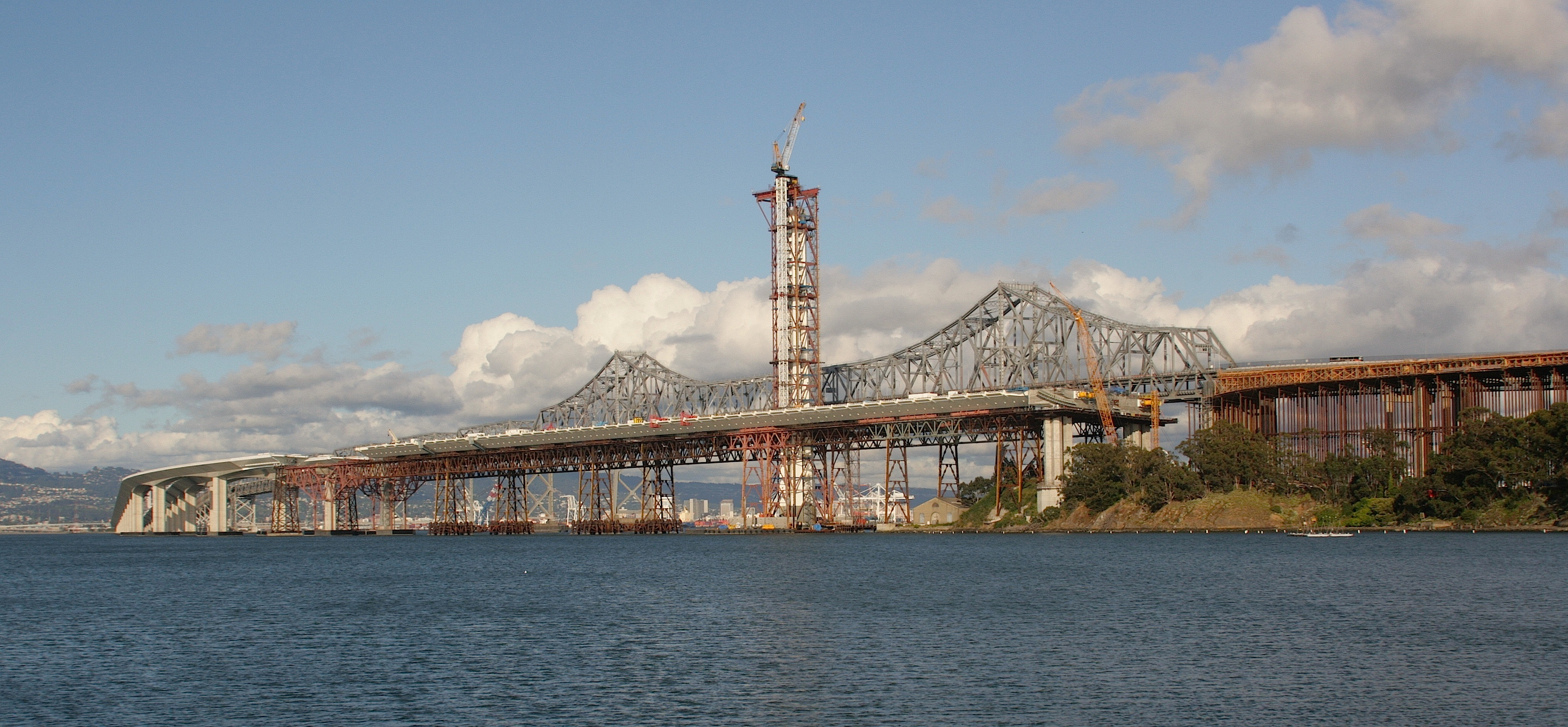
June 1, 2011: Construction progress on the SAS span on a late afternoon nearing the Summer solstice.

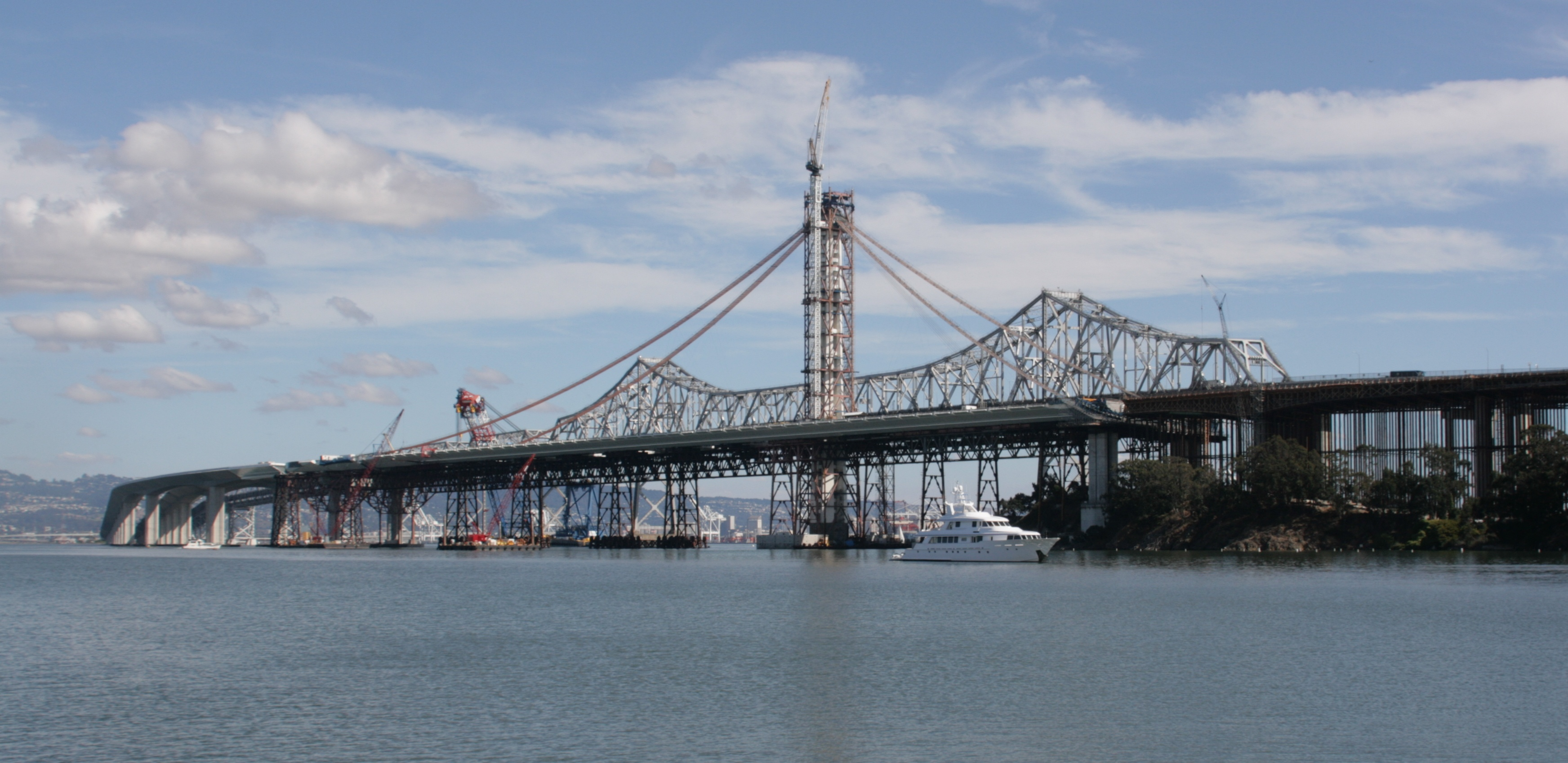
October 1, 2011: In the distance, the Left Coast Lifter is placing the last of the main span deck segments. Two additional short segments will join the main span to the curved skyway extension. The main suspension cables will follow the curves outlined by the recently installed catwalks. Ten holdback cables to the right of the tower (below the catwalks) preload the tower, bending it 17 inches (430 mm) west against the forces to be imposed by the main cable when the bridge is complete, allowing the tower to be vertical when the holdbacks are removed. Subsequent to this image the traveler support cabling and cabling supports were installed, and all of the main cable strands have been placed and compacted, the suspender cables hung, attached, and tensioned.

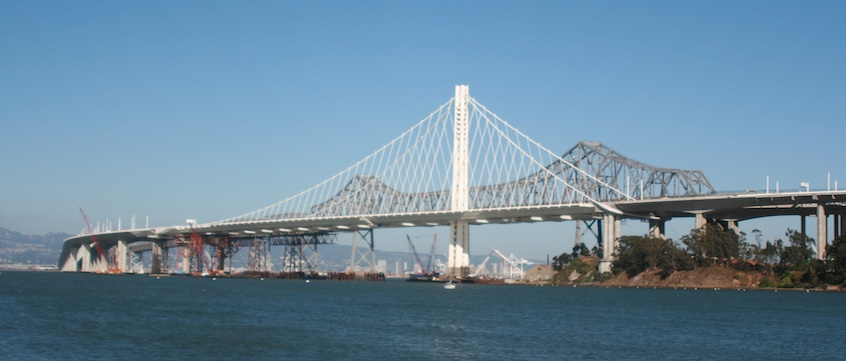
July 7, 2013: The new span is structurally complete and self-supporting. The cable catwalks have been removed and the tower frame disassembled - the remaining temporary falsework is being removed from the eastern end of the main span.

=== Main span tower ===
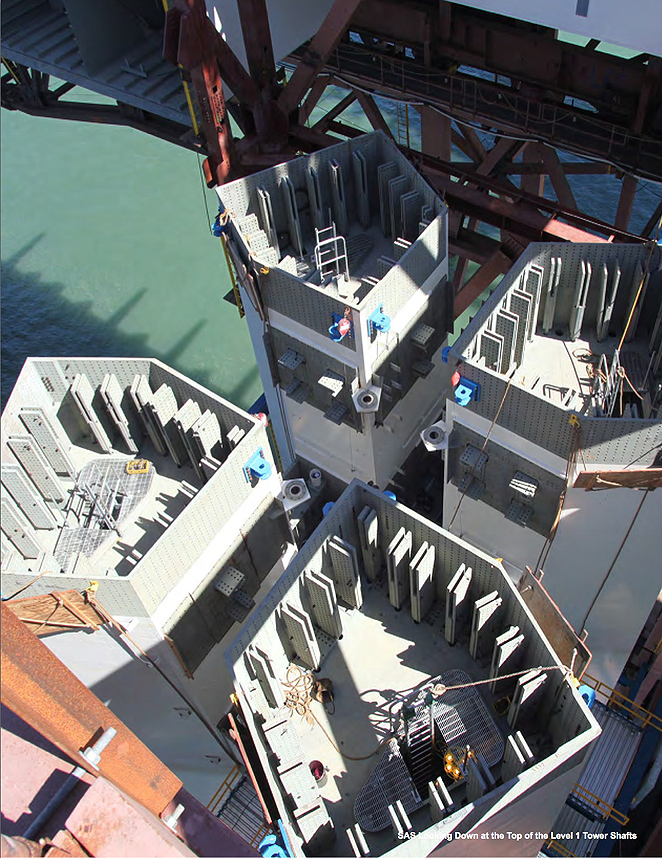
First stage tower segments showing cross section and attachment methods. The lower external gray areas will be covered by sacrificial box structures ("mechanical fuses"), while the upper are covered by external flat plates with numerous fasteners to join the segments.

The design employs extensive energy absorbing techniques to enable survivability and immediate access for emergency vehicles following a Maximum Credible Earthquake (MCE), estimated at 8.5 moment magnitude in a 1500-year time span. Rather than designing for rigidity, it is instead a flexible structure, with resonant motion absorbed by the plastic shear of sacrificial, replaceable components. Smaller earthquakes will impose mostly elastic stresses on components, with a higher proportion of plastic (and thus energy absorbing) stresses in larger earthquakes. This design philosophy extends to other metal components of the bridge, including the sacrificial tubular end keys that align the self-anchored suspension with its approach structures at each end.

The tower consists of four columns. Each roughly pentagonal column consists of four tapering and/or straight sections, joined end-to-end by external plates and internal stringer finger joints secured with fasteners. The columns are also joined horizontally by sacrificial box structures. These box joins are intended to absorb earthquake-induced motion by elastic and plastic shear deformation as the tower sways. Under a severe earthquake, this deformation absorbs energy that could otherwise lead to destructive tower motion, thus protecting the primary structure of the span. It is expected that this design will allow the immediate use of the bridge for emergency vehicles, with the joins being replaced as needed to restore the bridge to its original condition. Uniquely, the tower has no direct contact with the suspended side-by-side roadways separated in the middle by fifty feet, with enough space between the tower and the roadways to allow swaying under severe earthquakes without collision.

==== Tower construction ====
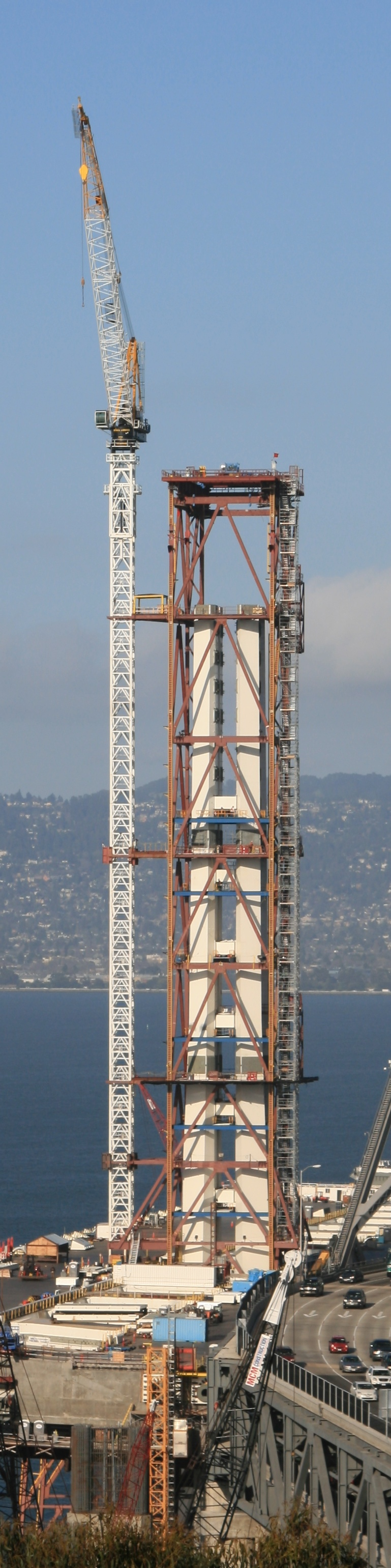
March 4, 2011: Phase 4 with all four columns in place; the jack-up crane (to the left) was used to erect and dismantle the scaffold, and a gantry crane atop the scaffold lifts and places the tower columns.

The process to build the SAS tower atop its foundation consisted of five phases. The first four phases each consisted of lifting segments of four similar columns and bolting them into place and to elements connecting them, while the last phase was to lift the final top cap that will carry the crowning main cable saddle. On July 28, 2010, the first of four below-deck main tower pillars was erected, having arrived earlier in the month by barge from China. They were placed by lifting one end from a barge into a temporary scaffold, with a carriage on the barge to allow the lower end to move into place. After the columns were bolted into place, the scaffolding was then extended upward to allow the next set of above deck columns to be erected, lifted, and translated into position, a process repeated for each of the remaining phases.

Tower erection continued when the second set of columns finally arrived in the week of October 24, 2010, almost three months after the first set were placed. The second set of columns were erected by a gantry atop the scaffold and were placed over the first four columns that were placed earlier in the year. After the columns were set into place, they were bolted together with the first set of columns. After this second phase was complete, the tower was now about 51 percent completed and stood at a height of 272 feet. The third set of tower columns did not arrive until the week of December 15, 2010. The third set, now with a larger crane, were lifted and placed over the second set of columns. The tower now stood at an impressive height of 374 feet and was 71 percent complete. The erection process did not continue until the following year when the final set of tower columns finally arrived by Valentine's Day, February 14, 2011. These four columns, each being 105.6 feet tall, were lifted in the week of February 28, 2011 and placed over the third set of columns. The tower now stood at a height of 480 feet and was 91 percent complete.

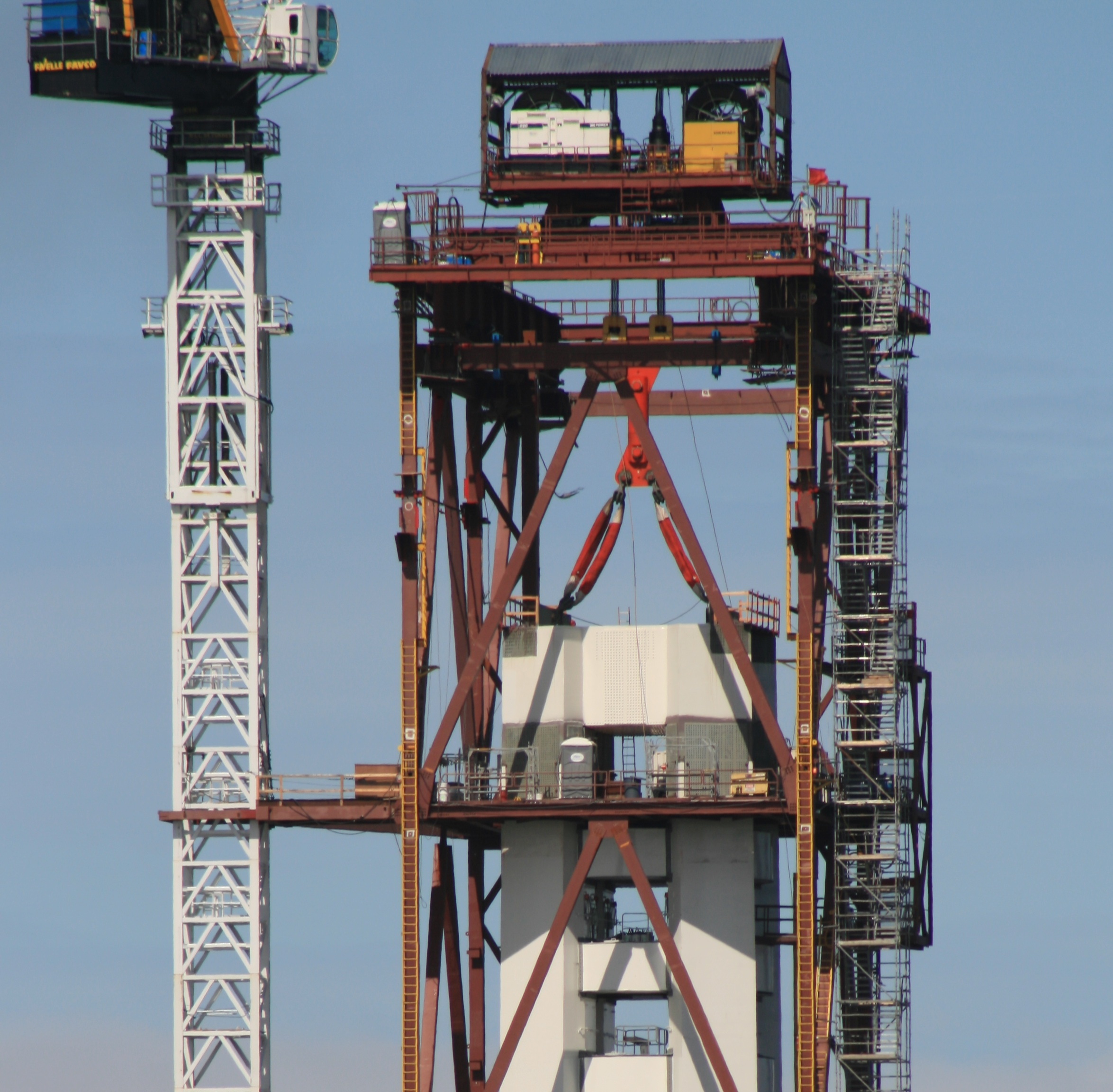
April 15, 2011: The grillage is now in place.

The fifth and final tower phase was to lift a grillage (a structure to join the columns, more commonly used as a foundation element) that weighs about 500 tons, lift the main 450-ton cable saddle, and finally lift the final tower head which completed the entire SAS tower. All of these final pieces arrived at the site the same day the fourth set of tower columns arrived. On April 15, 2011, the first part of the fifth and final phase began. The 500-ton grillage was lifted 500 feet in the air and was placed over the fourth set of columns. The tower then stood at a height of 495 feet and was 94 percent complete. It took about one day to lift and place the grillage on top of the tower.

==== Crowning double cable saddle emplacement ====
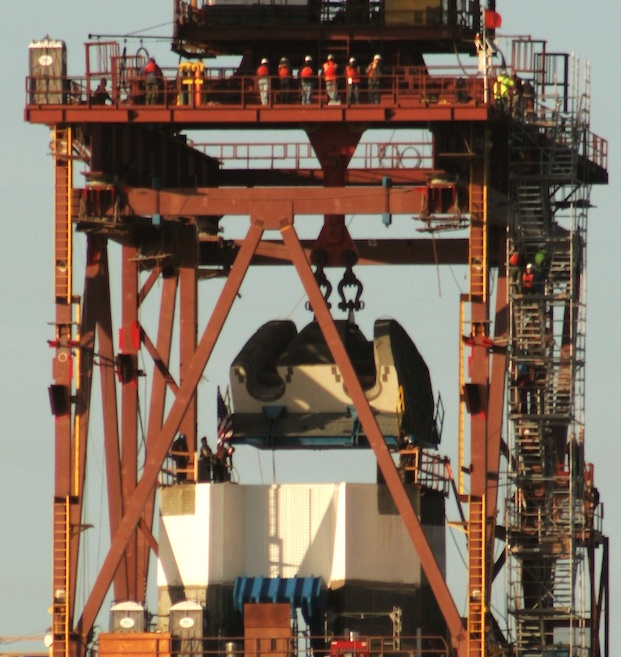
May 19, 2011: Near sunset, the cable saddle is being positioned before final touchdown.

Working the entire day of May 19, 2011, operating engineers and ironworkers lifted and placed the 900,000-pound (410,000 kg) double cable saddle atop the SAS tower. While a large portion of the span was fabricated in China, this particular piece was made in Japan, as were the eastern and western deviation saddles and main cable hydraulic jacking saddle.

This cable saddle guides and supports the mile-long main cable over the tower that was placed later in the year. In December 2011, the deck placement of the SAS span was completed and cable construction progress finally began. However, a few months before in July 2011, the tower head was lifted and placed over the saddle in a test fitting and was then removed to allow the laying of the cable. Later on in 2012, the cables were fully placed on the tower saddle and were then anchored throughout the whole SAS span. The tower head was then permanently installed for the final time, along with aircraft warning beacons, completing the entire SAS tower at a final height of 525 feet (160 m).

=== SAS main suspension cable ===
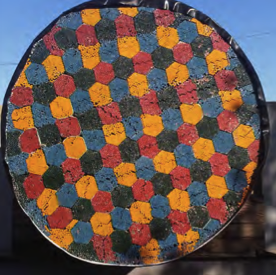
Compaction test section of the SAS cable; Distinct colors mark individual parallel wire strands, each a bundle of 127 pencil-thin wires. There are 137 such bundles, each individually terminated at the eastern end of the SAS.

The tower saddle includes eyebars for the attachment of temporary cables that supported four walkways, each a simple suspension bridge (called a catwalk) that allowed access to the cable spinning mechanism and the main cable during construction. In several ways similar to a ski lift, additional superior cables carried one or more of these travelers, wheeled devices that shuttled from one end of the span to the other, pulled by drafting cables manipulated by several winches.

Cable images

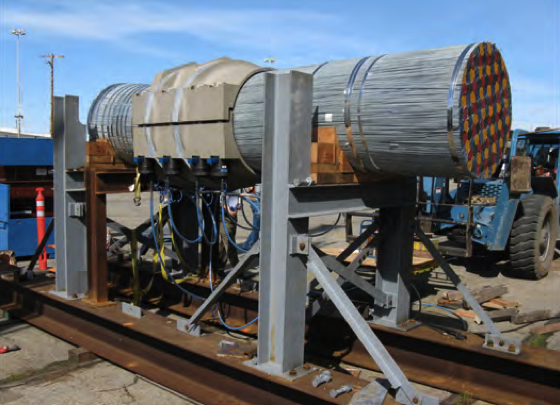
Compacted test sample, end shown above

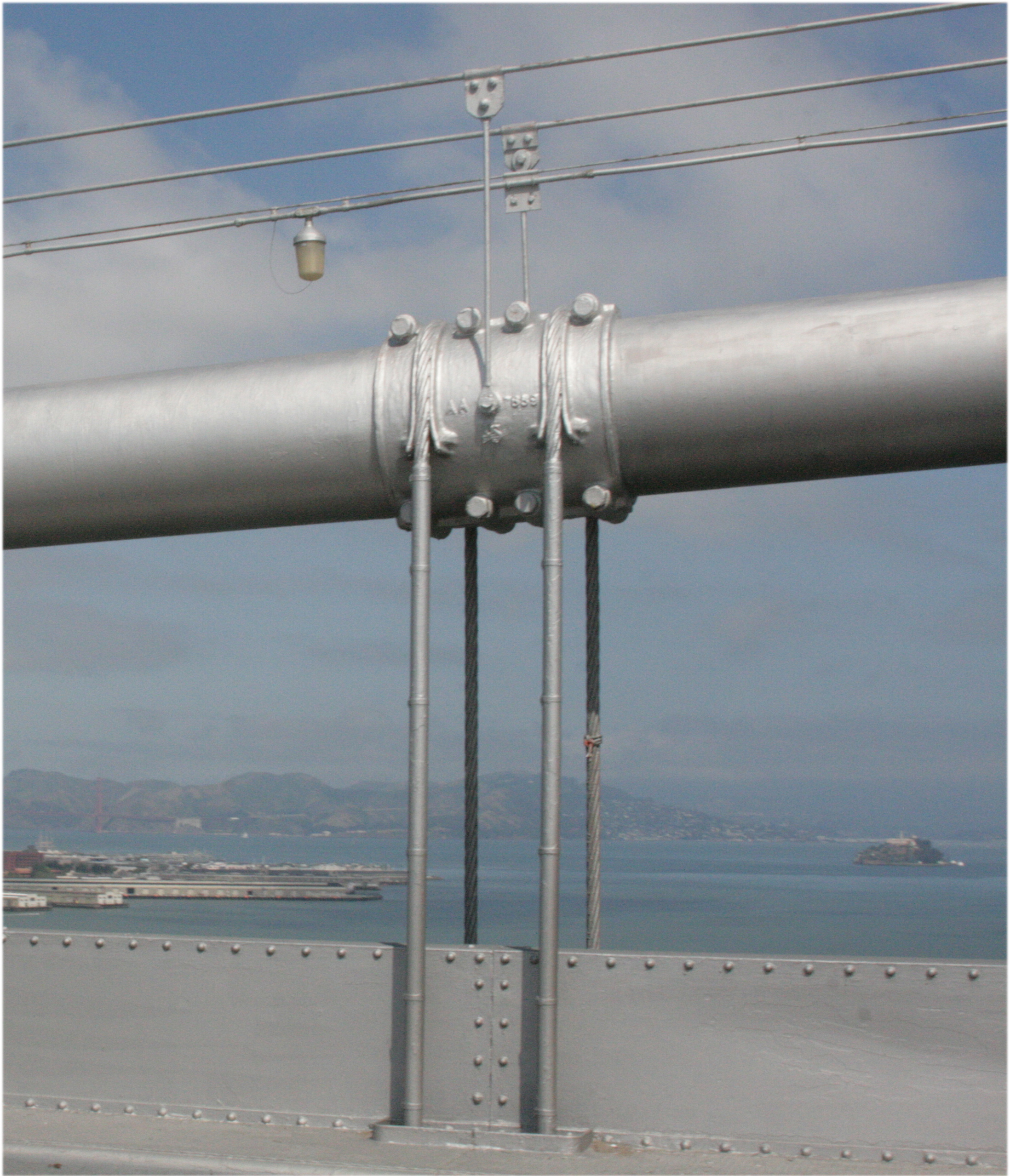
Suspender cable saddle on the western span

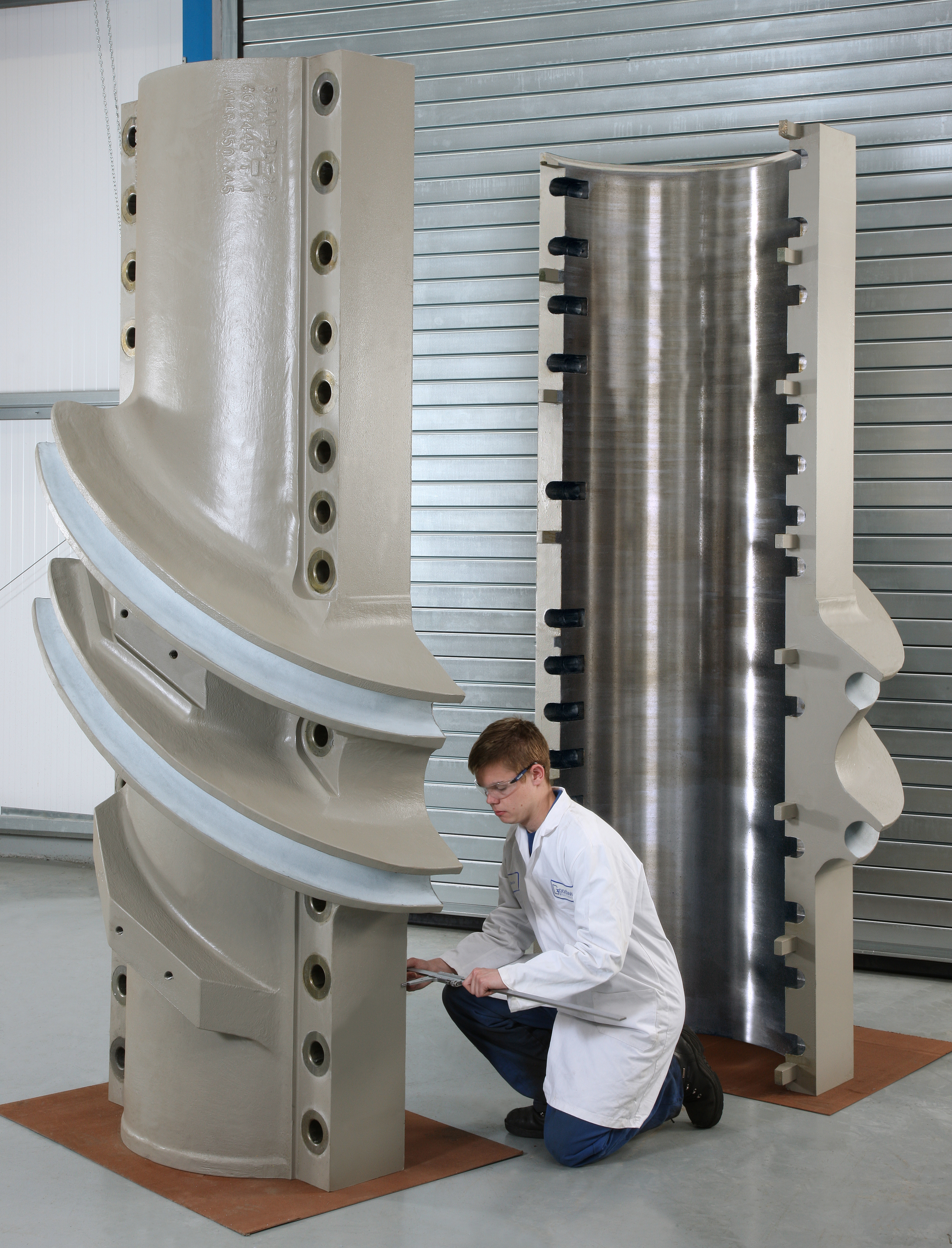
Suspender cable saddle for the new SAS span

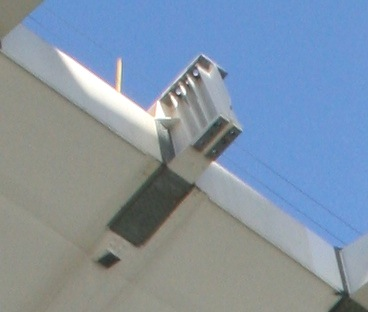
Suspender cable termination on SAS deck box

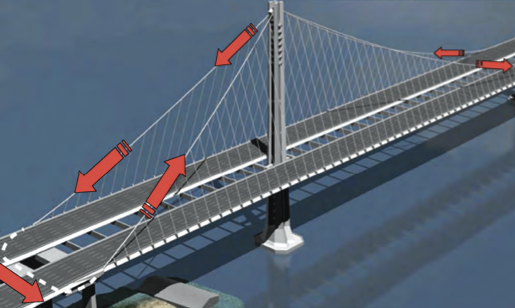
Dragging scheme for parallel wire strands, starting at the east end E2 and ending there on opposite sides

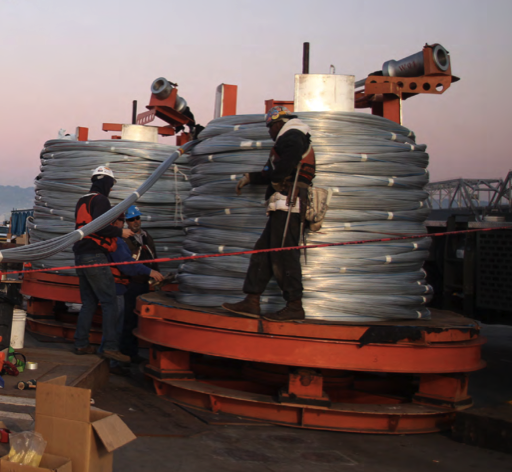
Two strand bundles have been placed upon unwinding spools.

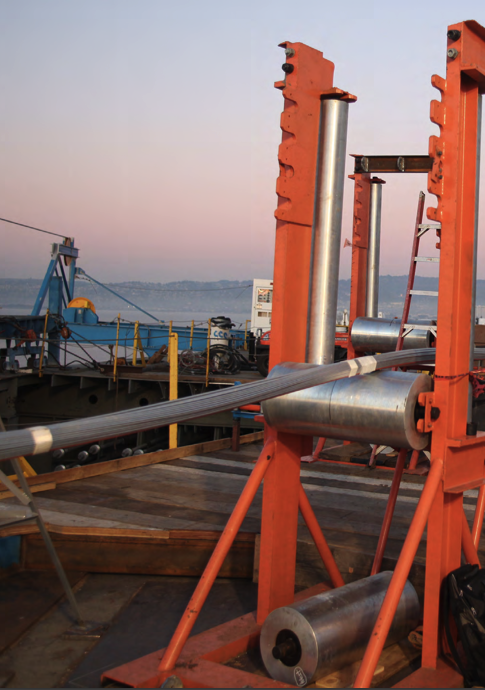
Unwinding from its spool, a strand passes through several launch guides.

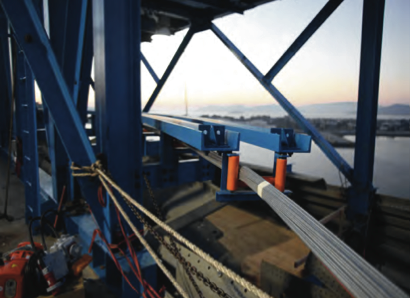
Strand is fed toward launch gantry.

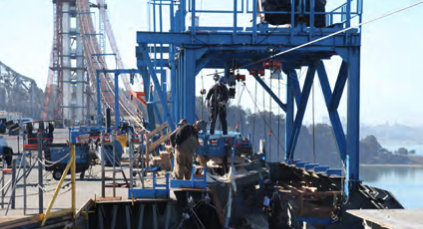
The launch gantry positions and tensions the support cable for the hauling frame.

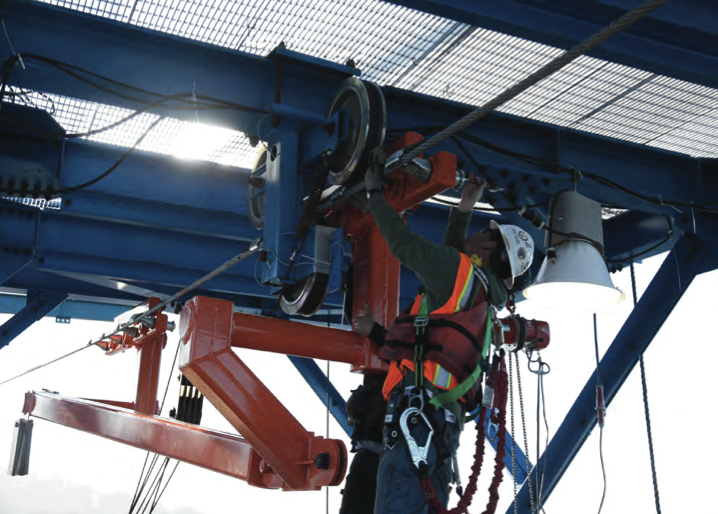
A worker inspects the hauling frame at the launch gantry.

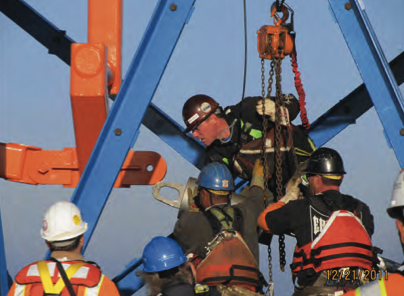
Attaching a strand to the hauling frame.

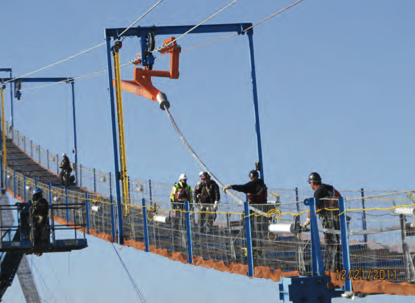
The first strand is pulled.

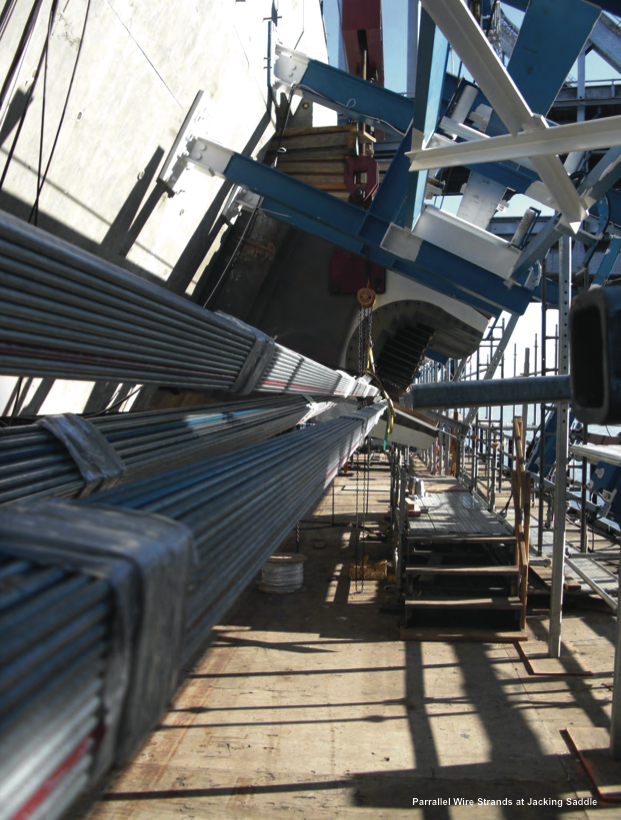
At the western end W2, the strands pass through the tensioning saddle.

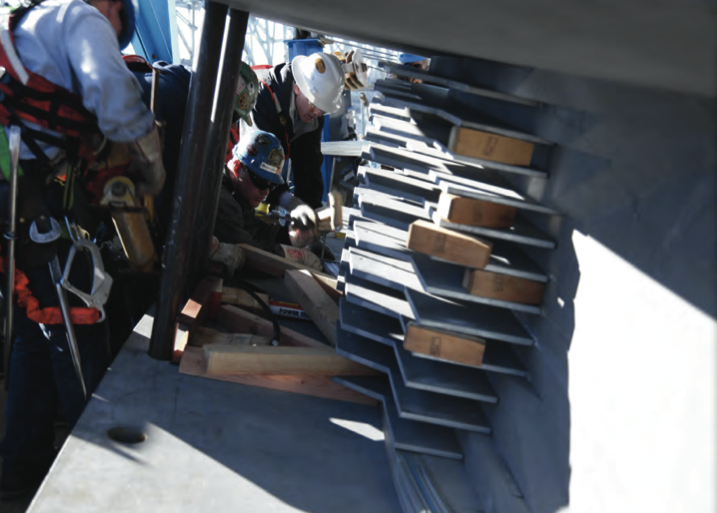
When a deviation saddle is encountered, the strand is guided through a specific comb slot. Wooden blocks are in place to prevent deformation of the adjacent strand guides.

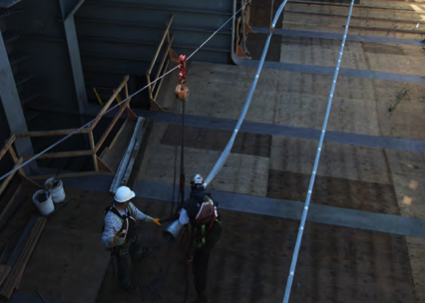
The strand is brought to the termination area.

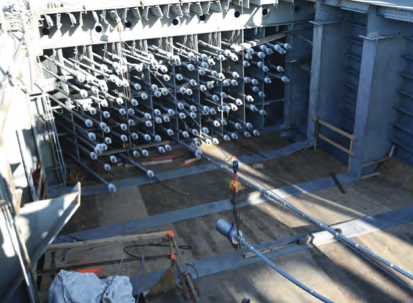
The strand will be attached to a specific termination.

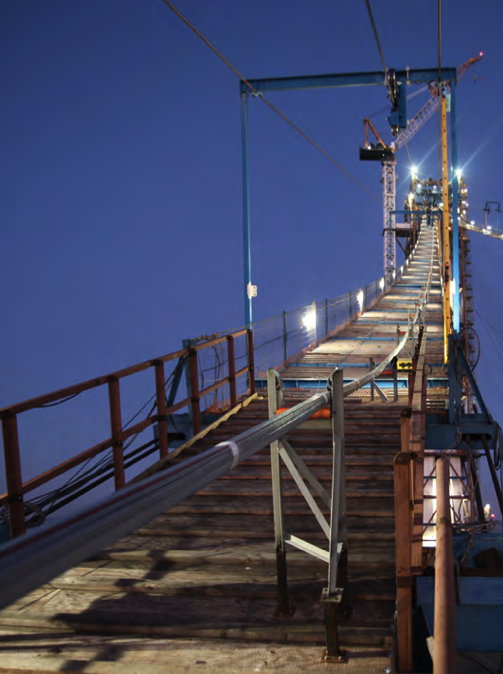
The first strand is in position and supported prior to termination and tensioning.

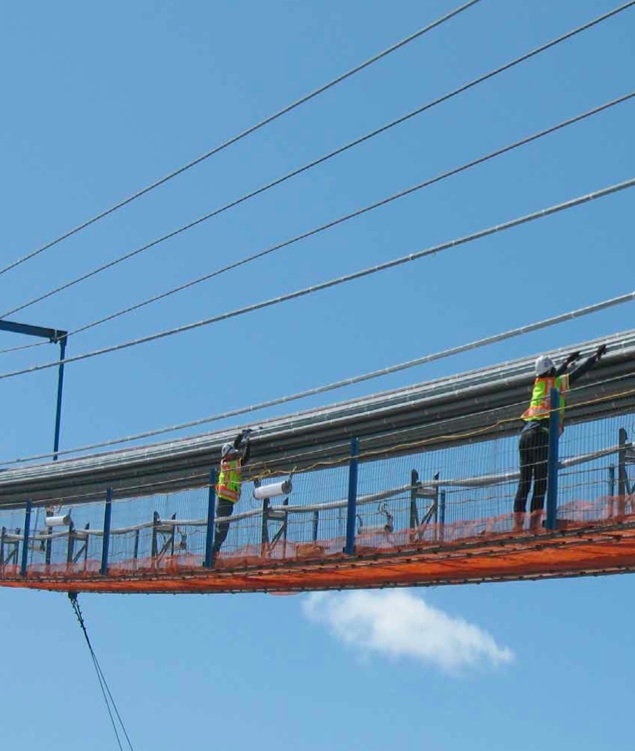
Inspectors dampening wind induced strand movement to allow strand measurements.

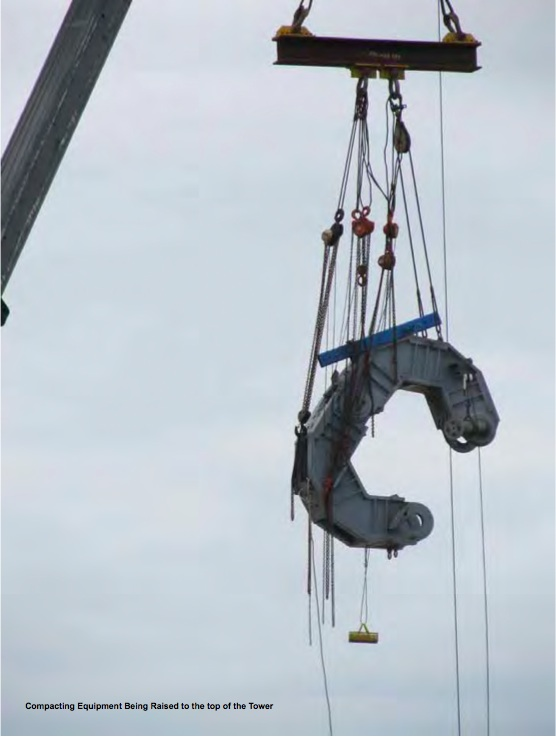
One of four main cable compactors is lifted into place.

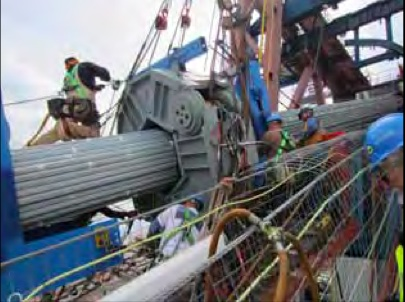
The cable compactor is moved to a starting point.

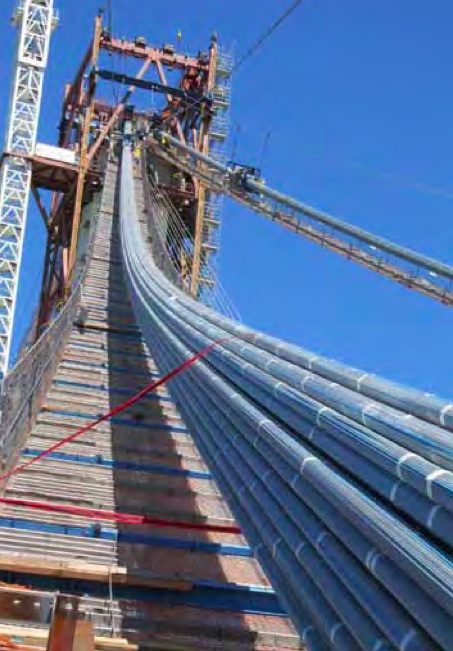
Compactors working on the western main cable sections.

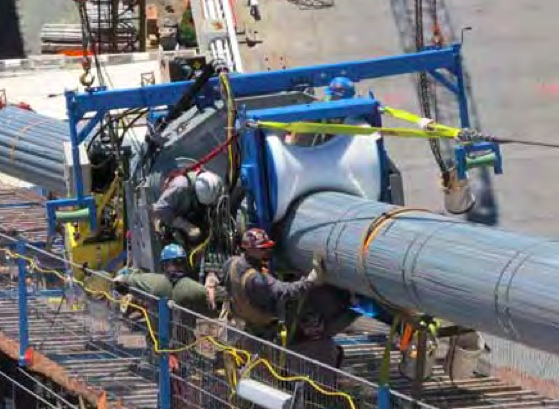
The effect of PWS compaction is seen, this to be followed by a finishing wire wrap after saddle placement.

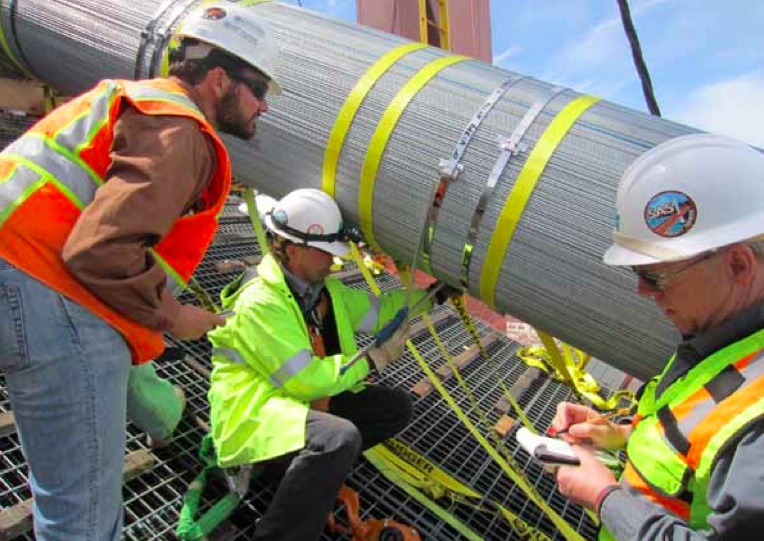
Inspectors verify proper compaction by measuring the cable's circumference.

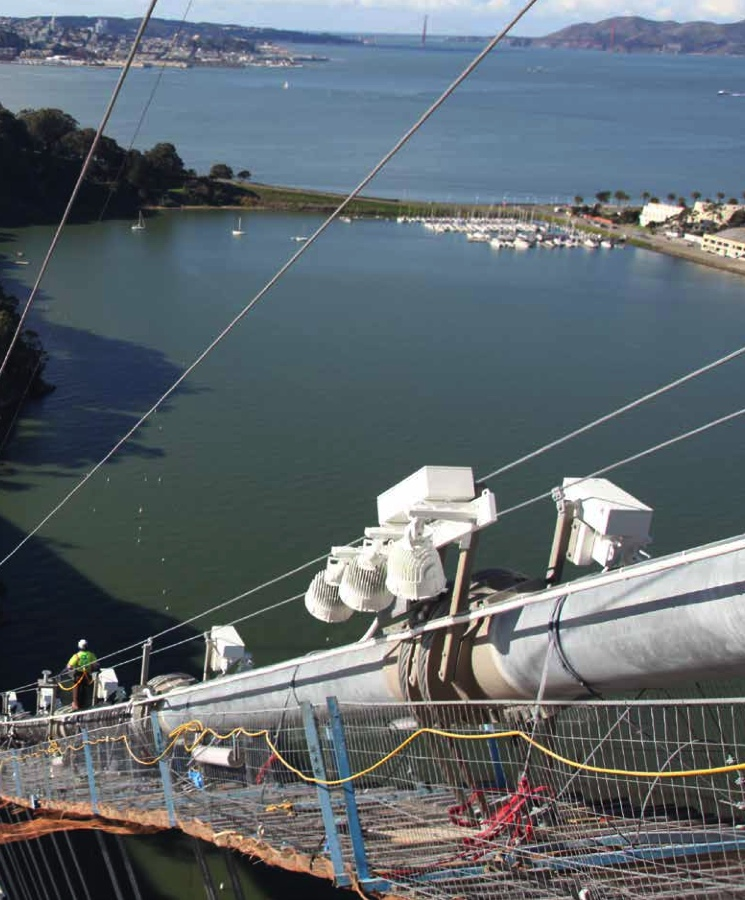
Following saddle placement, the final S-wire wrap has been applied and main span lighting fixtures mounted.

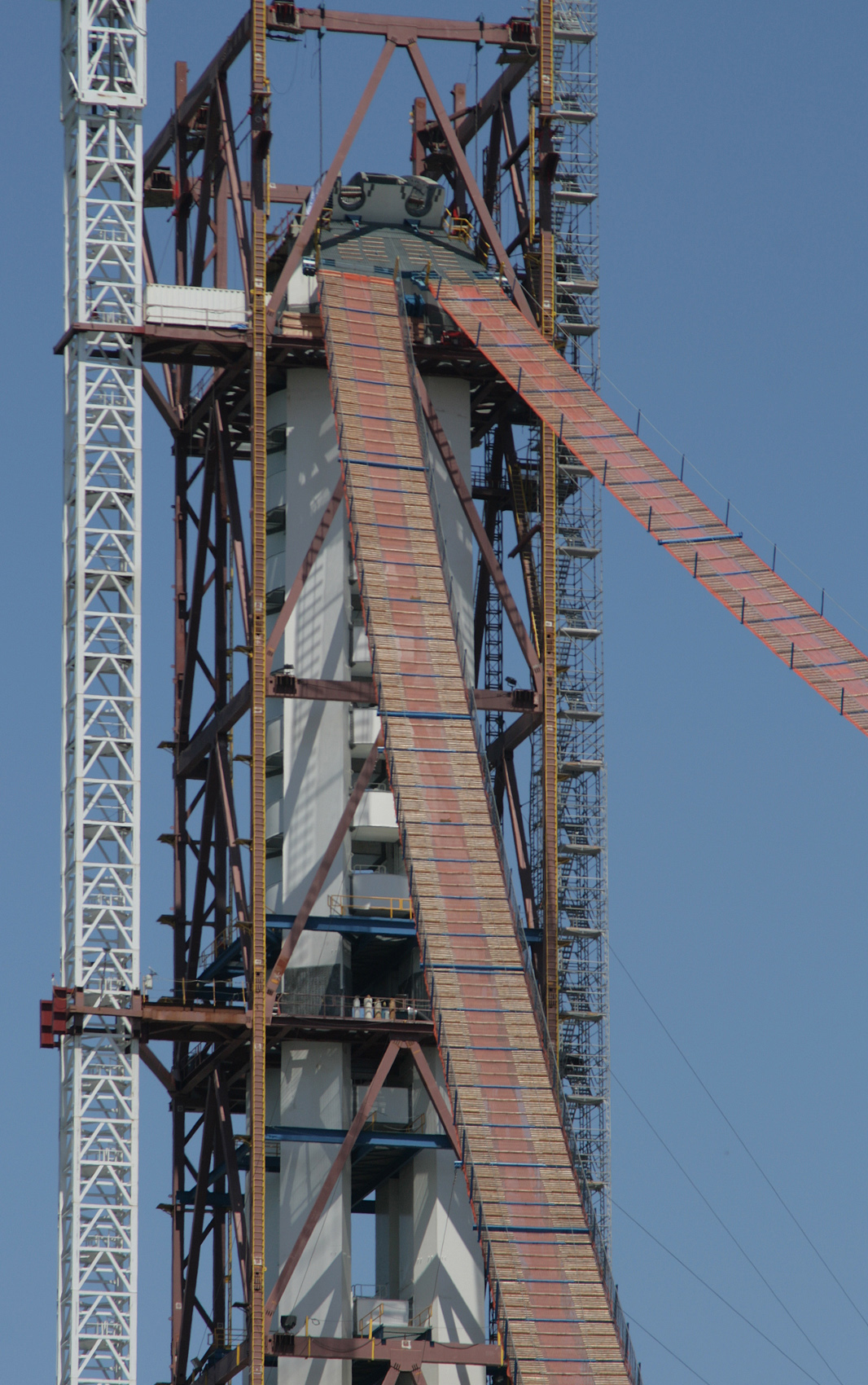
June 24, 2011: The gantry crane has been removed and two of the four temporary catwalks have been installed.

The main span uses a single cable, spun using pre-bundled groups of wires from an anchor point at the eastern end of the main span, across an eastern corner horizontal deviation saddle, over a vertical deviation saddle on the eastern end, up and over the corresponding half of the main tower saddle, down to a 90-degree deviation saddle at the western counterweight, across the counterweight, passing over the hydraulic tensioning saddle, around the opposing western deviation saddle, up to the other half of the main tower saddle, over an eastern vertical deviation saddle down to the final eastern corner deviation saddle, to the appropriate anchor point in the eastern strand anchor opposite the beginning.

As a bundle is laid down, it was initially supported by supports mounted on the catwalk, then both ends were attached and the cable is tensioned at the eastern anchor points. As with a conventional cable suspension span, all of the tensioned bundles were then compressed into a circular shape and protected with a circular wrap of wire. Saddles for suspender cables were added and suspender cables placed and tensioned. The suspender cable tensioning lifted the span from its supporting falsework.

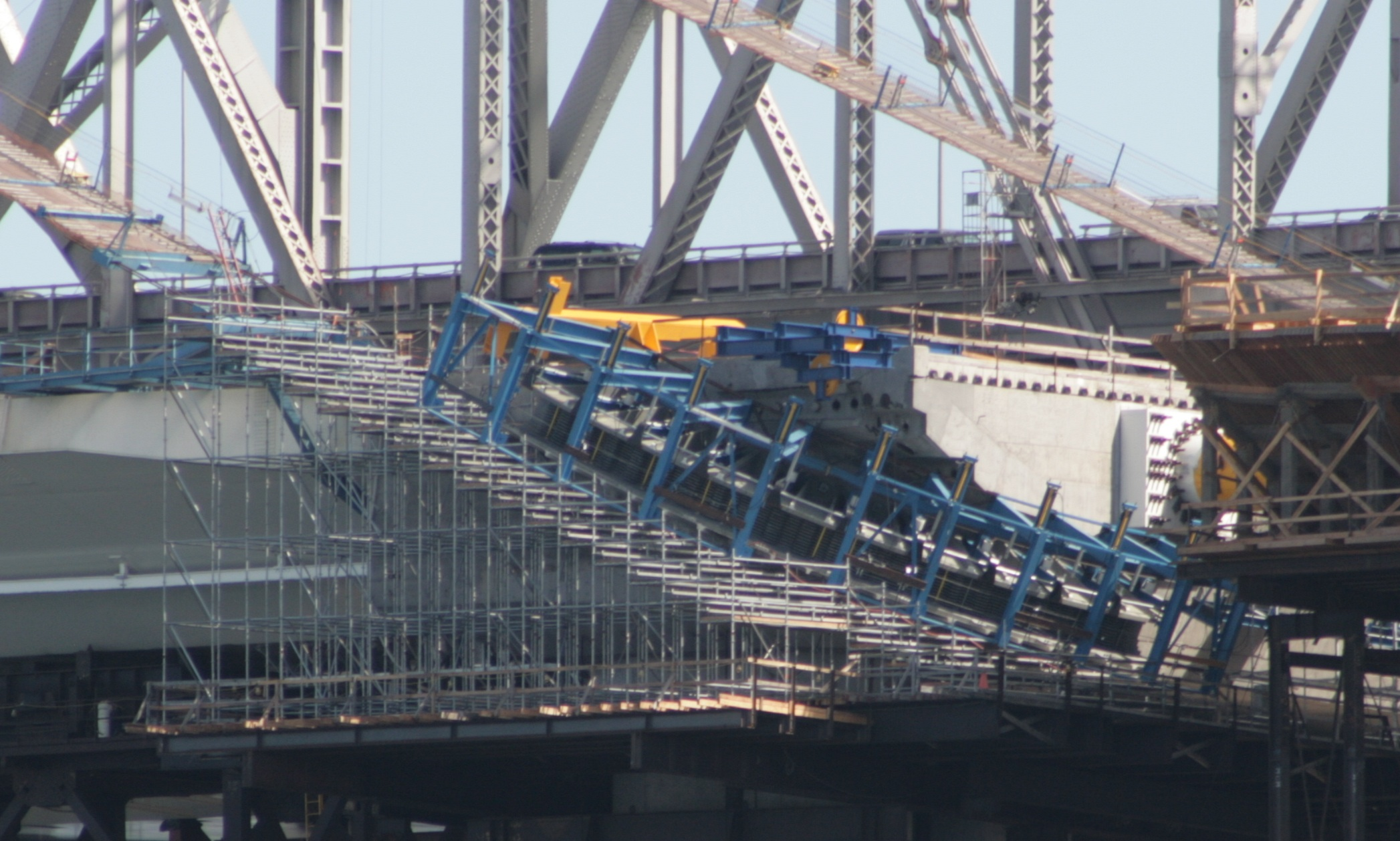
October 1, 2011: Tracks within the blue cage will guide the strand hauler around the deviation saddle, to continue across the jacking saddle and around the opposite deviation saddle.

In mid-June 2011, preparations for the spinning of the main cable began by installing the temporary catwalks on the SAS span. Both western catwalks were installed and by mid-August, all four catwalks were installed in place and an approximation of the completed outline of the bridge could then be seen. All four catwalks, the traveler, its suspension cable and the drafting cables and the winches and specialized tracks at the deviation saddles had to be in place before strand dragging could begin. These catwalks were required for worker's access to the cable strands for bundling and arrangement as the individual wires are placed.

Work in September 2011 included the installation of the turning tracks for the travelers at the western deviation saddles. These tracks allowed the continuous motion of the traveler across the western end of the main span. By mid-October 2011, the traveler cables were installed. A temporary group of tower stay cables to the west, intended to resist the overturning forces imposed by the bare main cable, were also installed. Subsequently, the eastern deviation saddles were installed, preparing the bridge for cable placement.

==== Cable placement ====
The cable construction technique differed significantly from that used for the earlier western spans and similar conventional suspension bridges. In that method, the cables were spun only a few wires at a time, with bundles made up as the wires were spun by pulling a loop along the cable's route. The SAS used a different technique, with the wire strands pre-fabricated into mile-long cable bundles with bundle terminations already in place, pulled by dragging one end through the route. After attachment to the termination, a tensioning operation was performed on each bundle at the eastern anchor point, and the bundles were suspended a few feet above the catwalk. A total of 137 such bundles were installed. As bundles were positioned, they were temporarily tied together to form the cable. The cable was completely in place in late May 2012. It was later compacted into a circular shape, and then wrapped with a protective wire jacket. In mid-March 2013, the western portion was completed and the catwalks were removed. Wire wrapping was still in progress on the eastern portion.

Since the main cables curve and the suspender cables splay outward to the deck edge, the saddle design is individual to the location, being fabricated in mirror image pairs for each side. In mid-June 2012, most saddles were in place upon the main cable. Wire rope suspender cables were then draped over these saddles and later were pulled outward and attached to projections from the main deck.

On a conventional suspension bridge, sections of deck are hung in place and so immediately tension the suspenders. The proper initial length of each suspender is predetermined by engineering calculations and adjustments are required for segment relative positioning and equality of load distribution amongst the several suspenders of the section. On this bridge, the deck sections were already in a fixed relative position (being joined together and resting upon the falsework) and all suspender cables must be brought to specific tensions individually in order to tension the main cable. A jacking saddle on the western end is used to balance the tension among the sections of the single main cable.

Suspender cable tensioning is performed in stages. The degree of tensioning at various stages and the order of tensioning is critical to this procedure.

Starting in 2011, proper balance between main cable runs and suspender cables and proper tension were applied to the main and suspender cables. On November 20, 2012, this process was completed which made the SAS portion of the bridge self-supporting. After that, the falsework was removed.

Phase	Description
1	Jack and tension 26 of 50 suspender groups on each side (8 at a time in the first 3 steps, 2 in the fourth step), followed then final adjustments (steps 5–18). In the first 8 steps, 80% of the load was transferred from the temporary truss to the cable.
2	Jack and tension 3 more suspender groups, bringing the total to 29 of 50 on each side.
3	Jack and tension the final 21 suspender groups, finishing tensioning the cables.

=== Yerba Buena Island Transition Structure ===
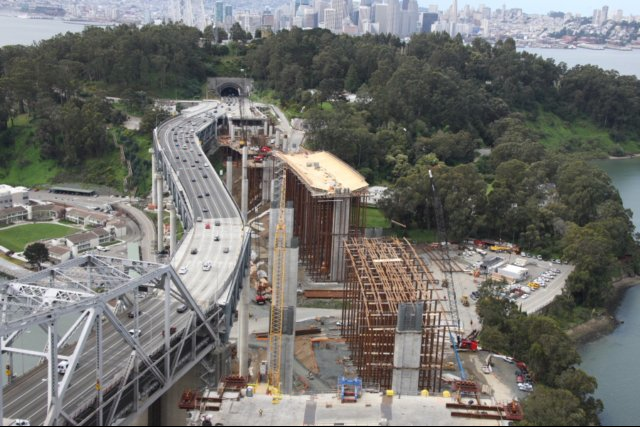
Several construction phases can be seen in this early 2011 image, from finished columns to falsework erection through formwork completion prior to concrete pouring. Left: Temporary double deck S-Curve (upper deck is westbound toward tunnel). Center: Southern columns (for eastbound traffic from tunnel lower deck). Right: Northern columns, falsework, and formwork (westbound to tunnel upper deck).

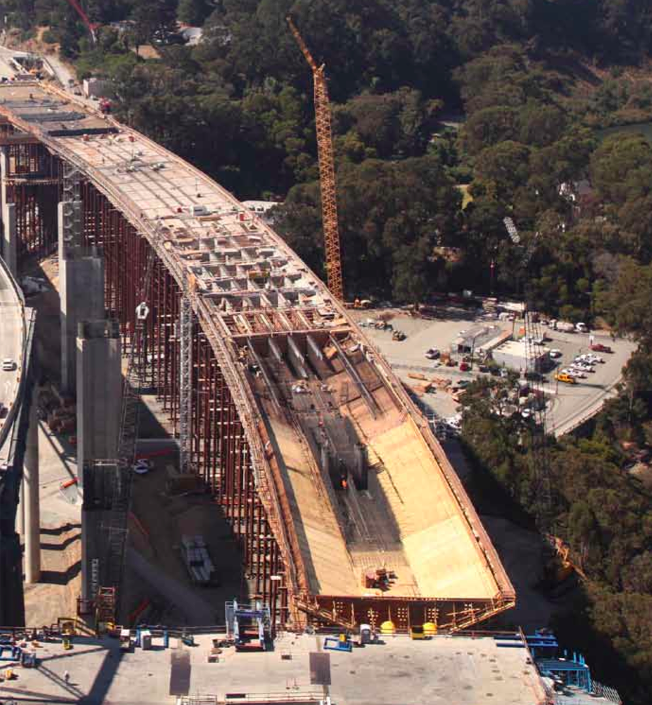
Late 2011 Progress: A portion of the SAS span is seen the bottom of the image.

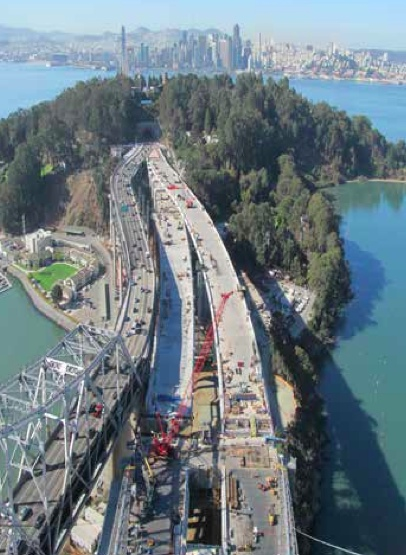
Late Summer, 2012: The westbound link falsework and formswork were disassembled and are now used to construct the eastbound link (center of image).

The Yerba Buena Island Transition Structure (YBITS) is an elevated roadway that bridges the gap from the SAS span to the Yerba Buena Island tunnel. Much like the Oakland Touchdown on the other side of the new bridge, this section of the bridge is also an end segment, meaning that the purpose of this segment is to transition portions of the existing bridge to the main spans of the new bridge. The connecting structure transitions the new bridge's side-by-side roadways to the upper and lower decks of the YBI tunnel. In mid-February 2012, the northern structure has been poured and formwork was being removed. In early September 2012, the falsework had been removed, modified, and constructed at the eastbound location with formwork completion now allowing reinforcing and concrete placement.

==== Column design ====
There are a number of columns supporting the structure. As the ground level rises from the shore to the level of the Yerba Buena Tunnel, the height of the above ground portion of the columns varies. Since the rock structure supporting these is a hard shale, it would be normal under previous engineering methods to simply dig a relatively shallow foundation for each column, with the structural length varying progressively. Modern seismic analysis and computer simulations revealed the problem with such a design; while the long columns could flex several feet at the top (0.6 meter, more or less), the shorter columns were likely to break, since the rigid deck structures cause the imposition of a similar amount of motion at the tops of the columns, imposing more bending stress per unit length on the shorter columns. This problem was solved by making the columns of similar (but not uniform) length, with the "shorter" columns extending in permanent open shafts to deep foundations. This allows all columns of the YBITS to respond in a sufficiently uniform manner. The space between a column and its pit is covered by a protective sacrificial cover, forming a type of base isolation system at the more sensitive column locations. In addition, the western landing of the YBITS is a zero moment hinge, and so there are no vertical bending stresses at that point.

==== Construction techniques ====
The construction process to build this structure consists of several steps, shown below:

YBITS Construction

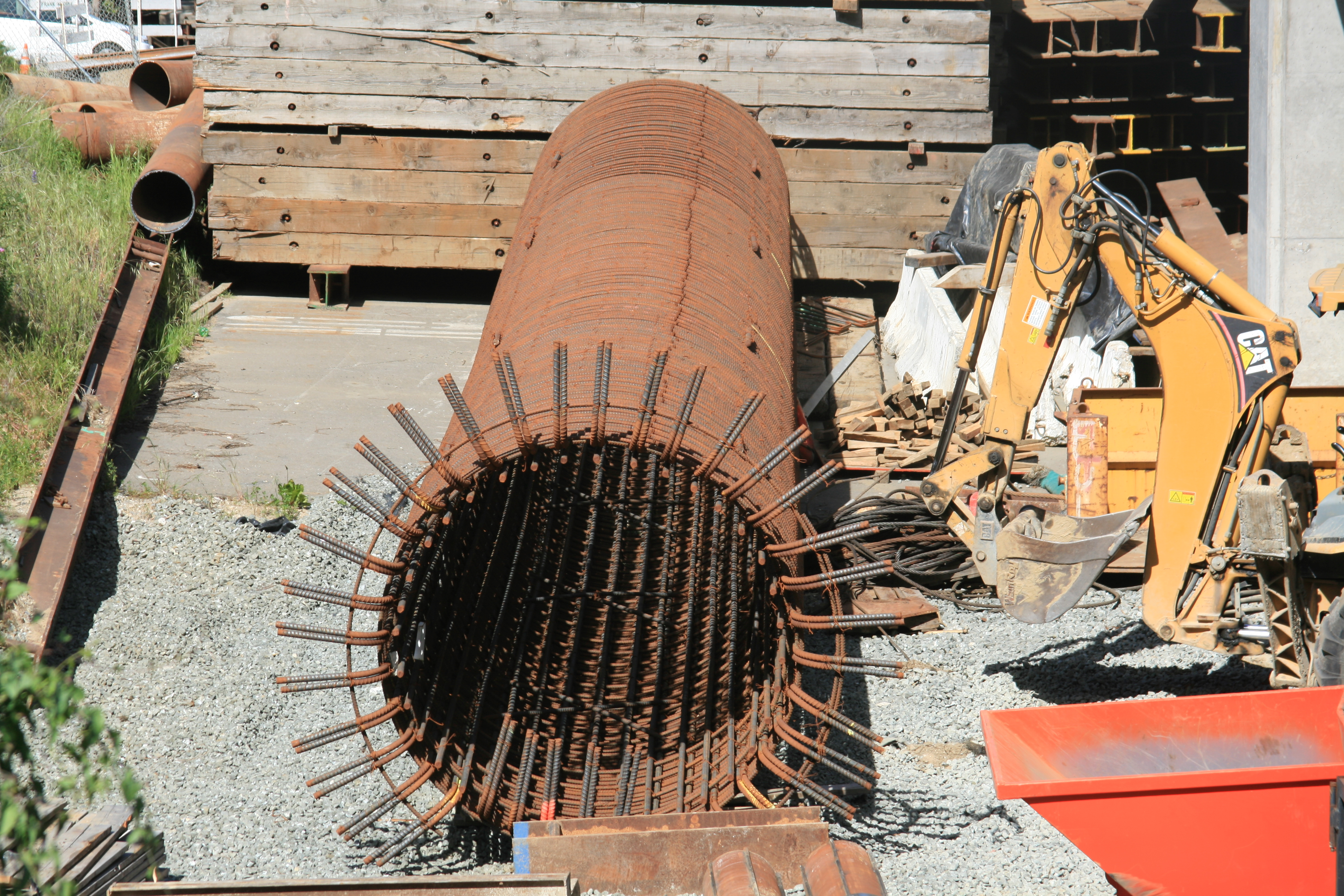
Rebar assembly: This will be erected, attached to foundation rebar and then enclosed by reusable column formwork and cast in concrete.

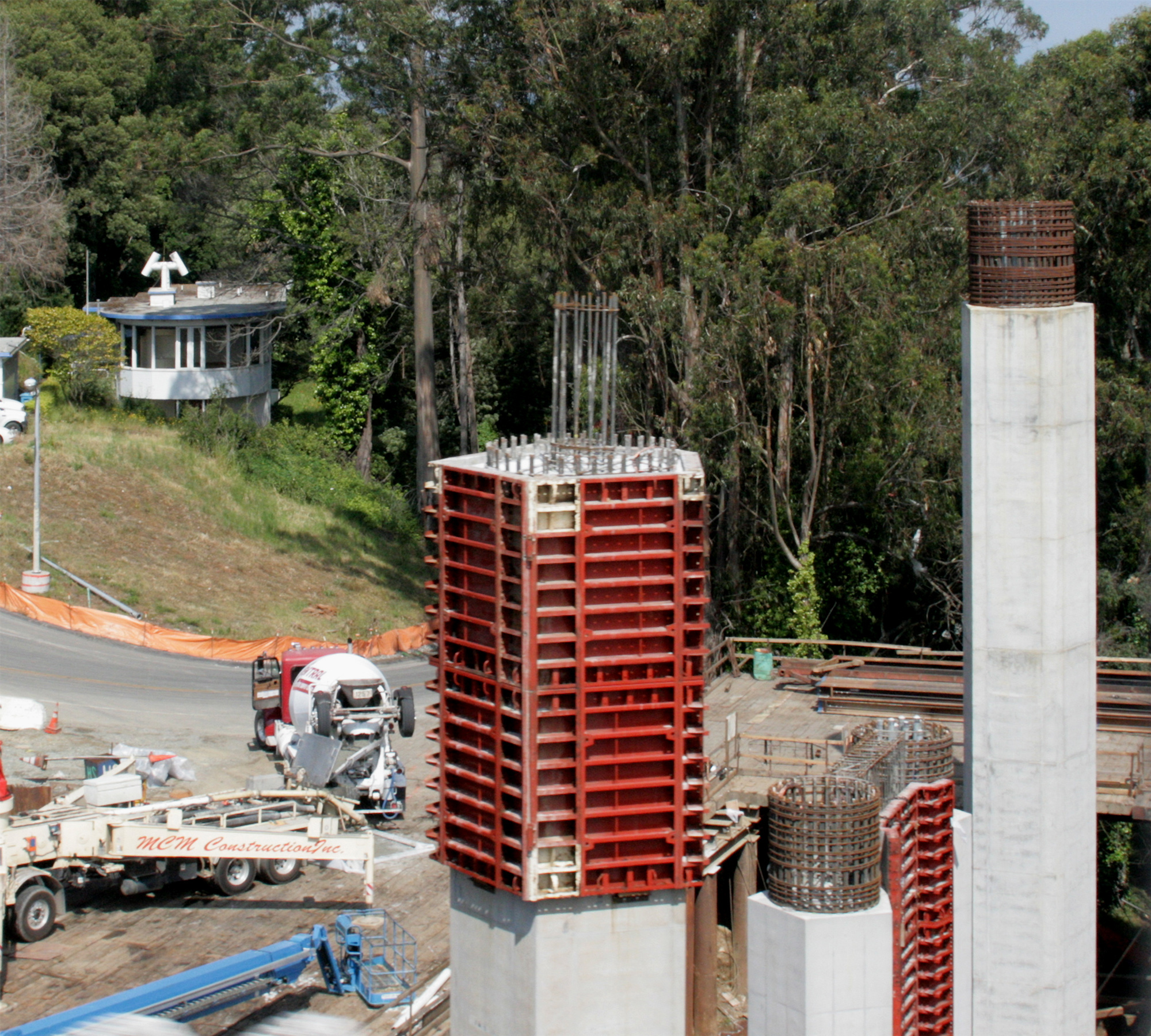
Column formwork: A monolithically cast column (formed in a single concrete pour) with its segmented metal formwork being disassembled from the bottom up.

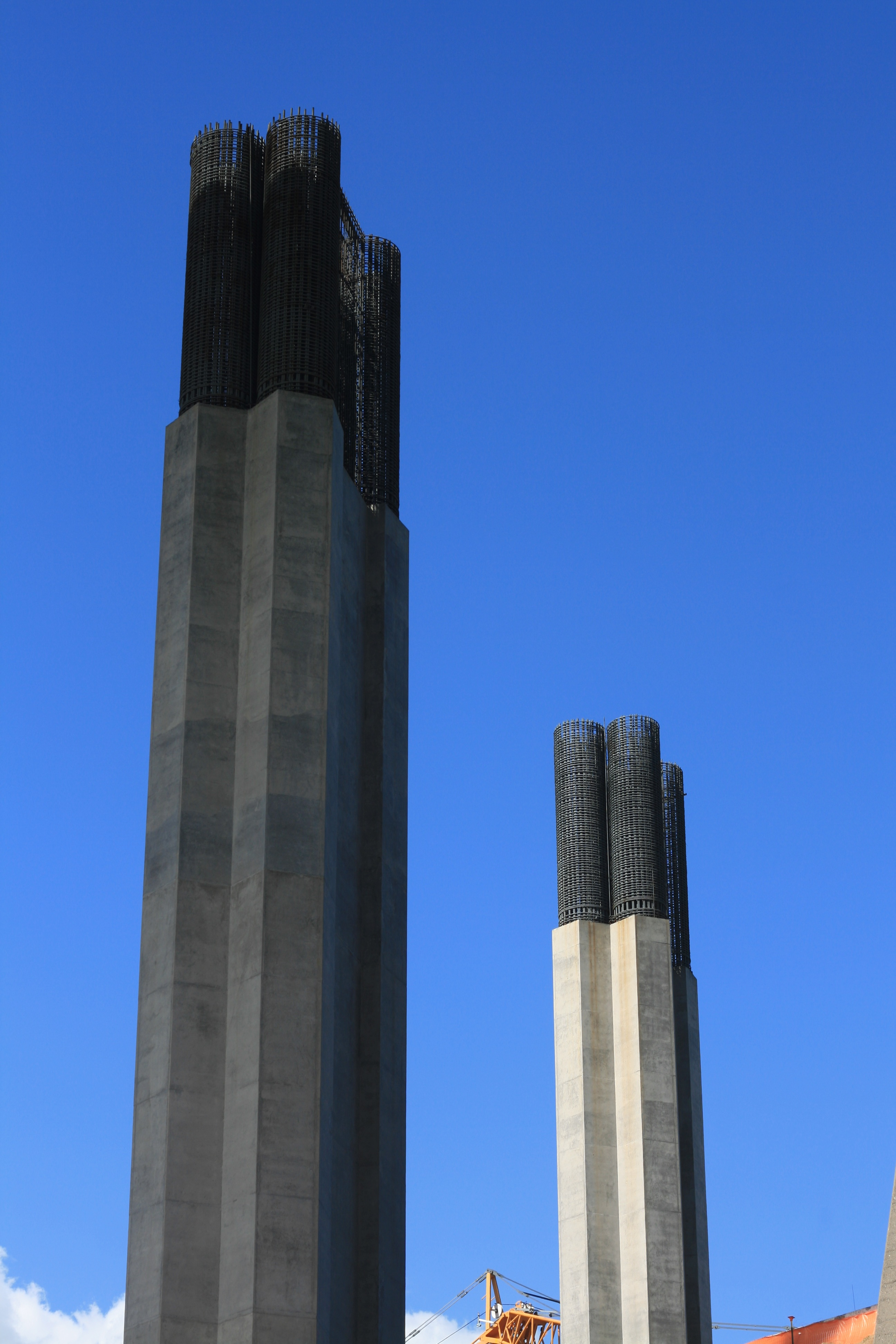
Completed columns: A T-cap will be enclosed by the box-beam road structure.

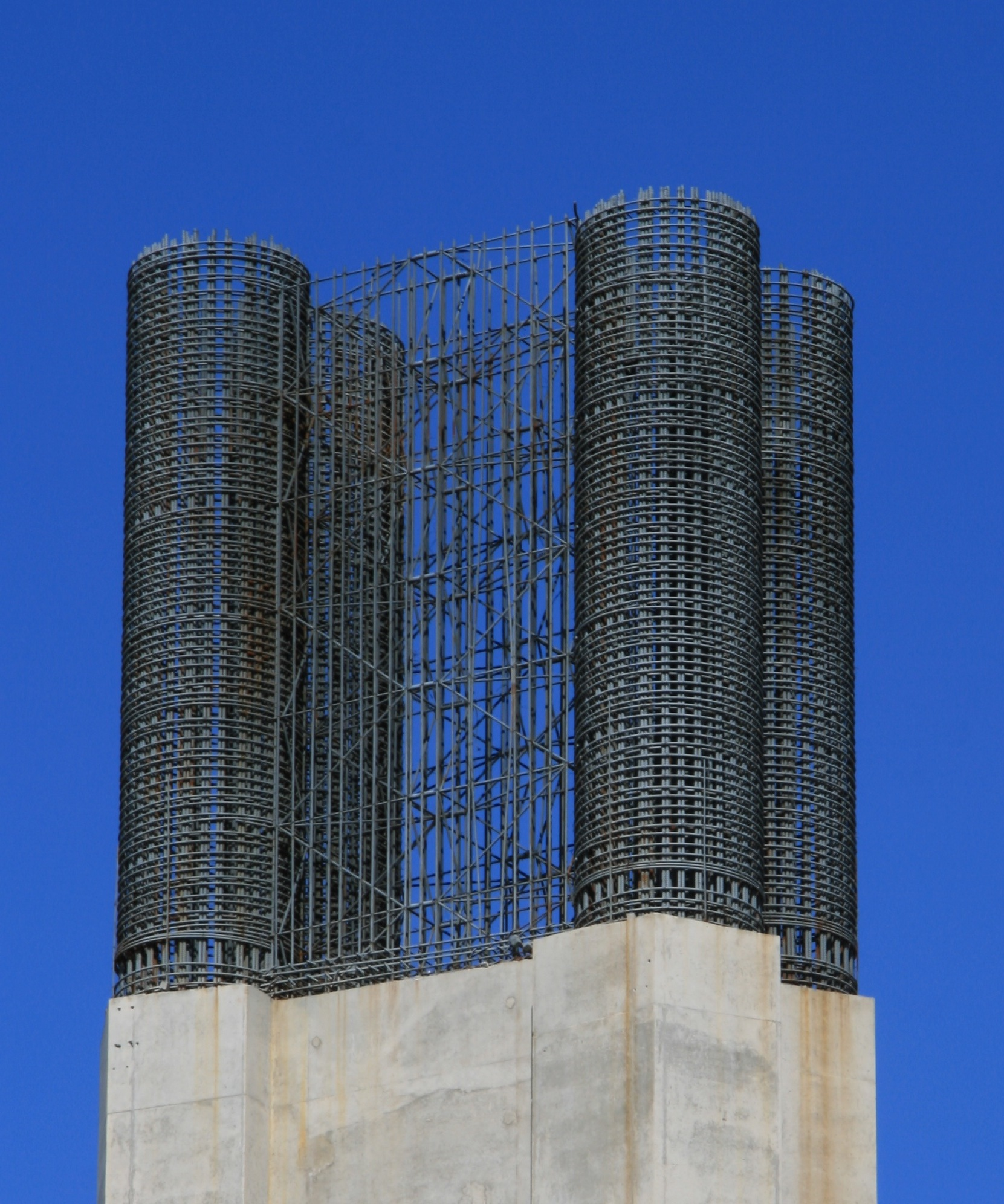
Rebar detail: Note the size and amount of horizontal hoop rebar. It was discovered after the Loma Prieta event that this was the most critical portion of the reinforcing in order to ensure column survival.

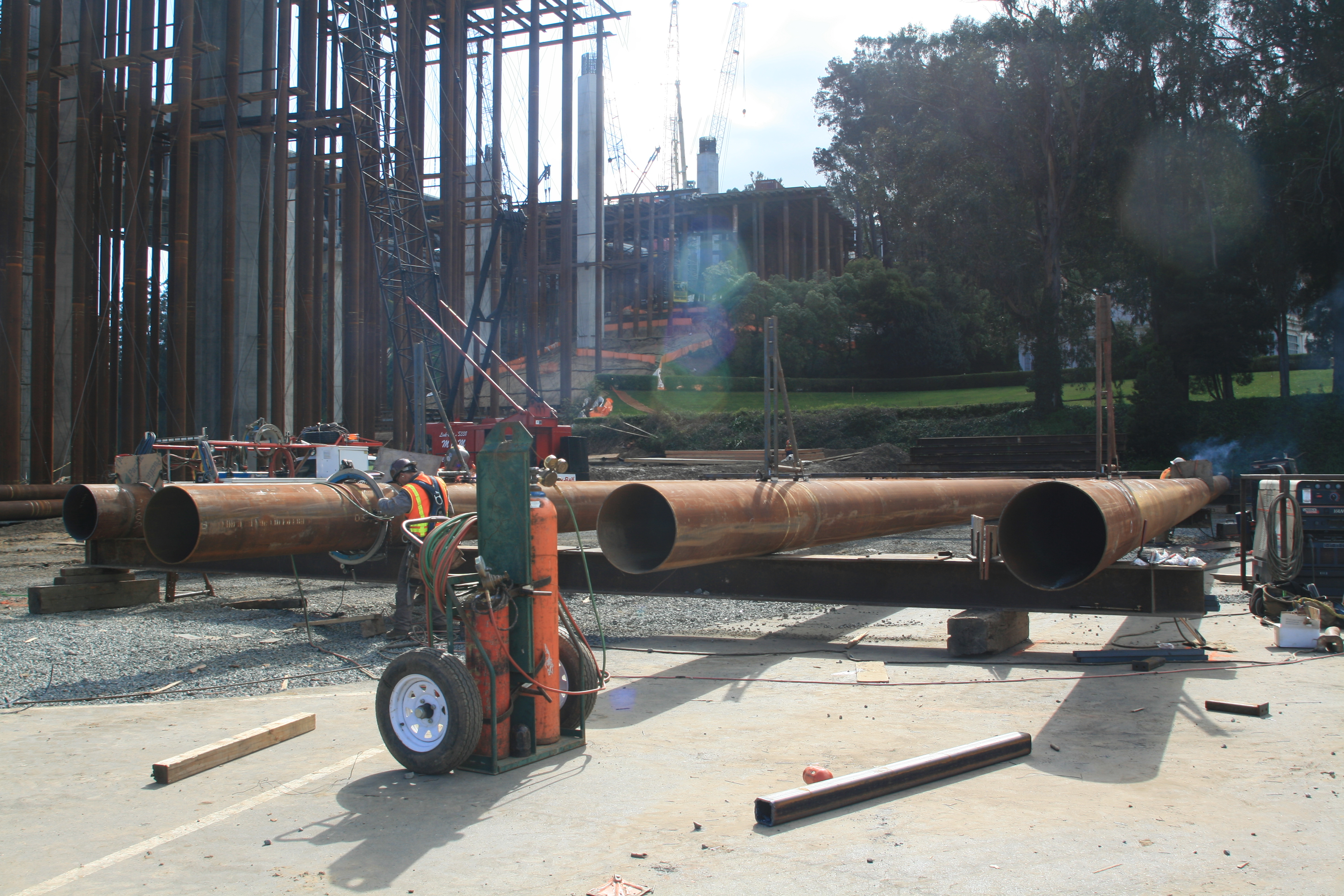
Falsework fabrication: Metalworkers fabricate a falsework section from pipe and beams.

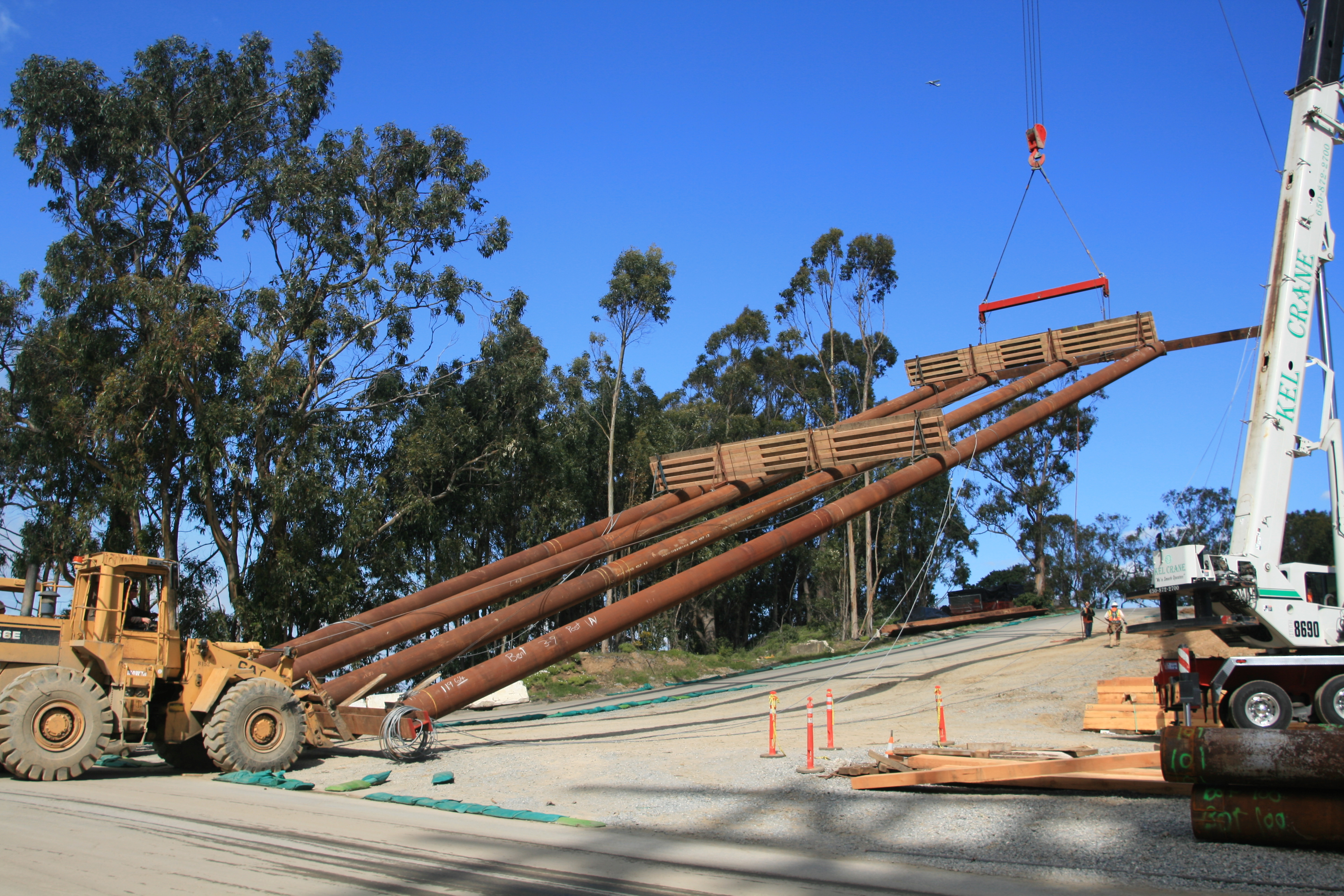
Falsework erection: A section is lifted to a vertical position with the assistance of two forklift operators.

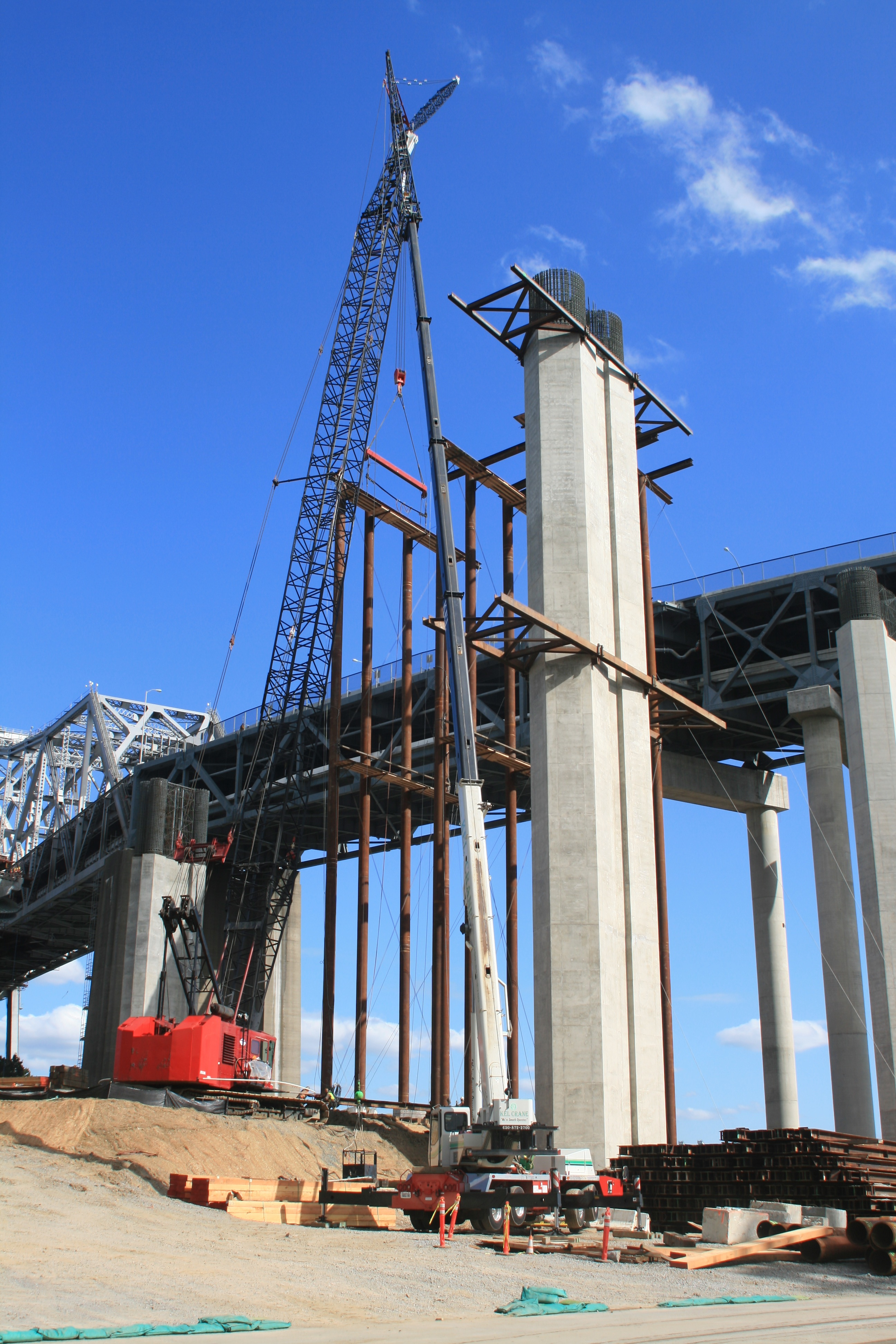
Falsework placement: The section is guided to its position on foundation blocking by a ground crew.

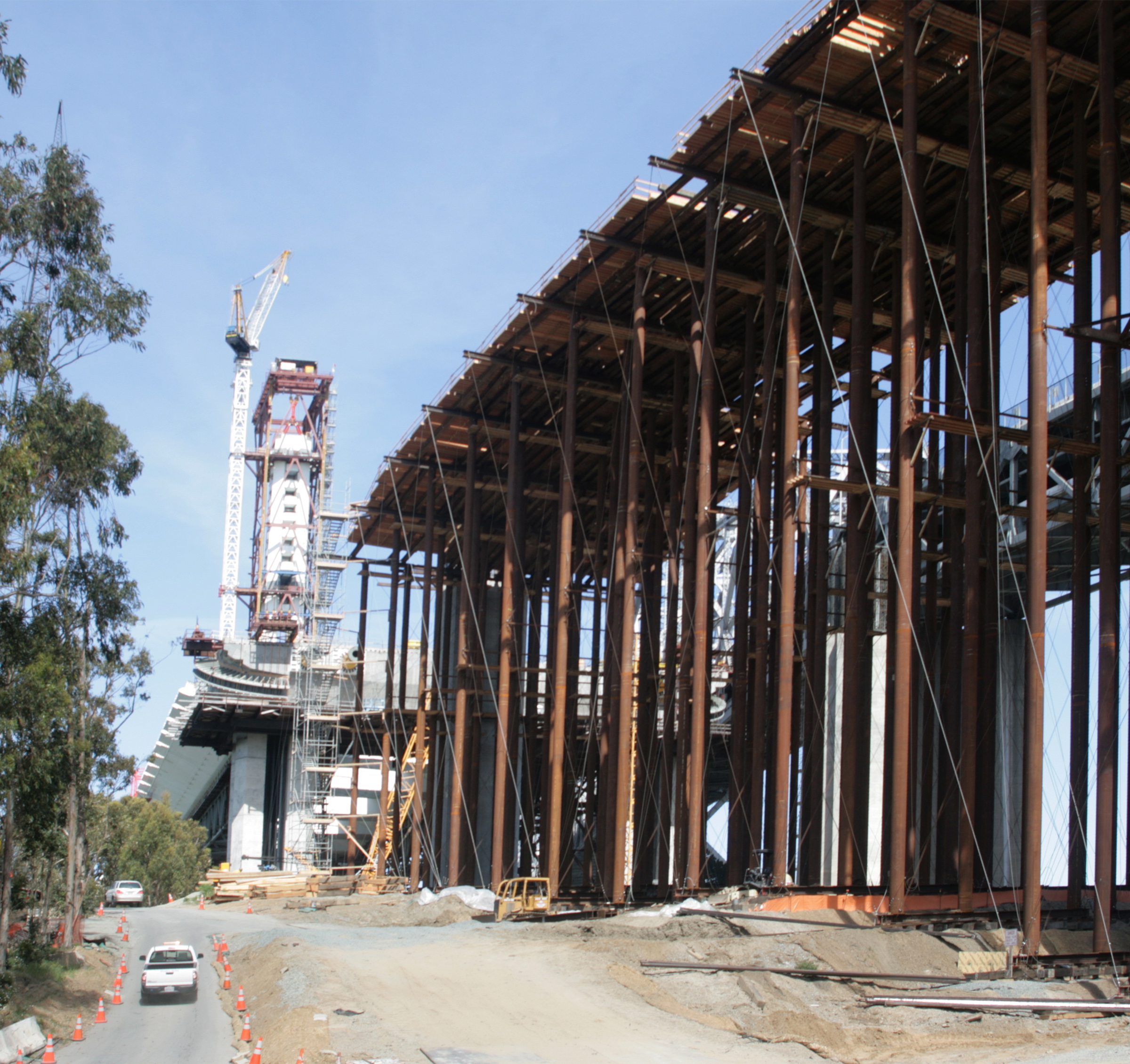
Completed falsework: Decking and some formwork have been added.

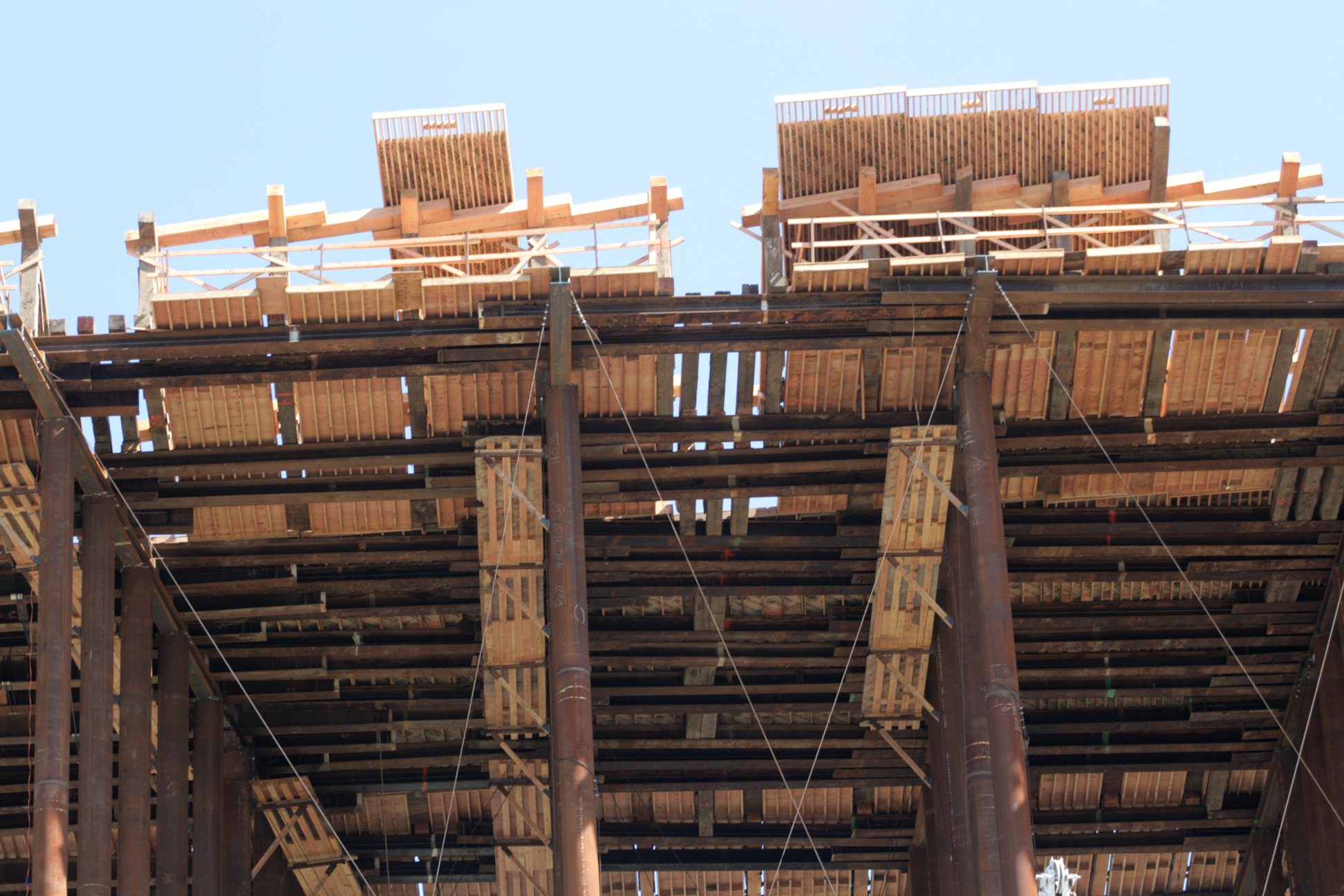
Formwork detail: The upper panels form the lowest surface of outer portion of the concrete connector, lower panels form a deck for worker access.

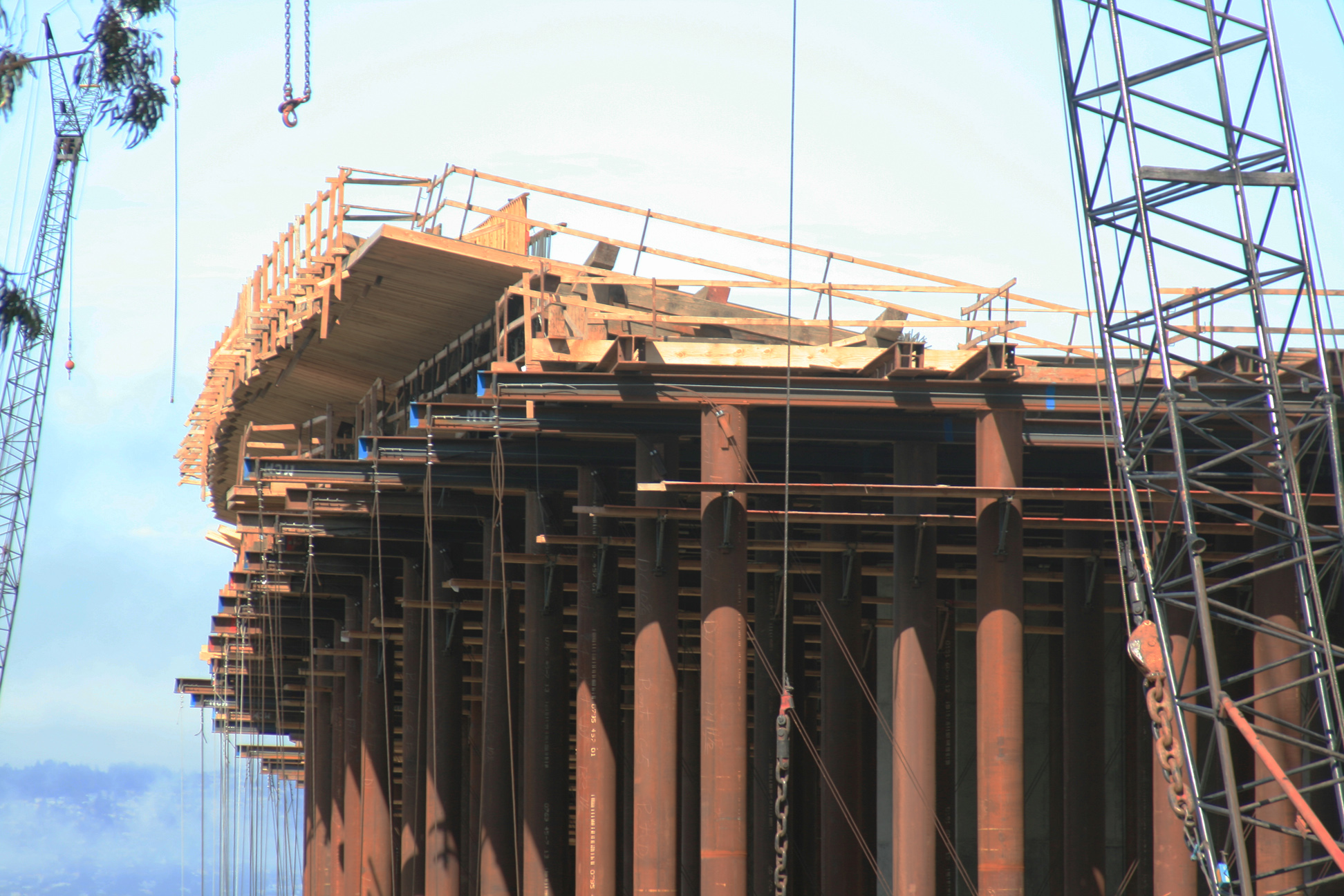
Profile: The shape of the final structure reduces the need for internal bracing

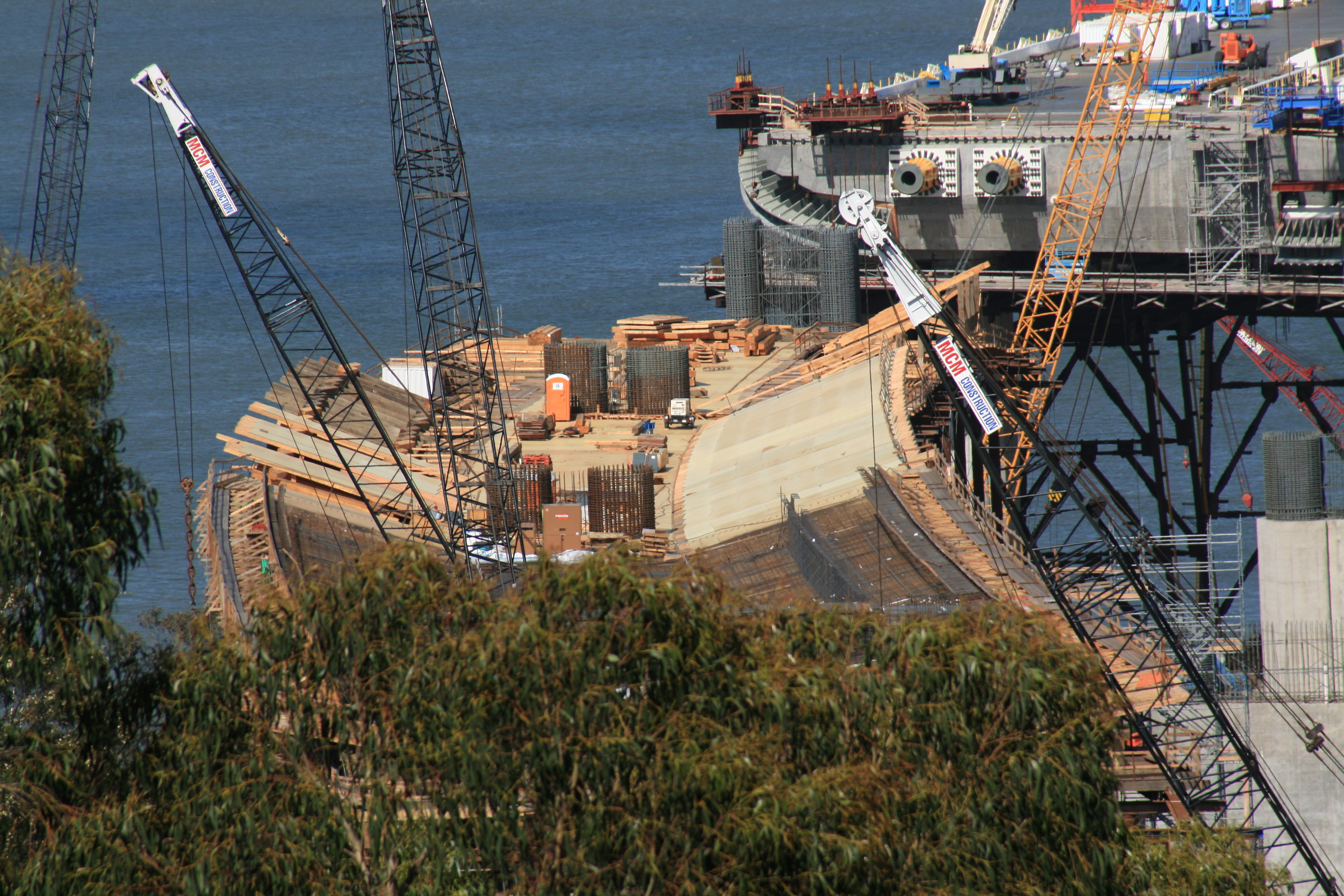
Surface and rebar: The rebar for internal shear beams may be seen on the right side just over the trees. Additional structure will connect the columns to the flyover.

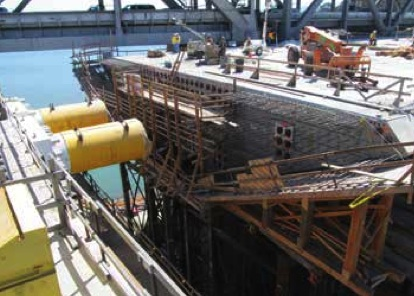
Post tensioning: Terminations attached to tendon cables are pulled by jacks and secured - this eliminates any sag when the formswork is removed and also stiffens and strengthens the structure.

The first step is to construct foundations of the large columns that will support the elevated roadway of the YBITS. Above-grade column reinforcing is constructed and enclosed by formwork and concrete is poured. After curing, the formwork is then removed. The next step is to build the roadway itself. The spans were cast in place, using extensive reinforcing, with post-tensioned cable tendons. The roadways consist of hollow box structures, cast in place in sections using formwork, owing both to the complex shapes involved and the necessity of maintaining traffic flow on adjacent structures during construction.

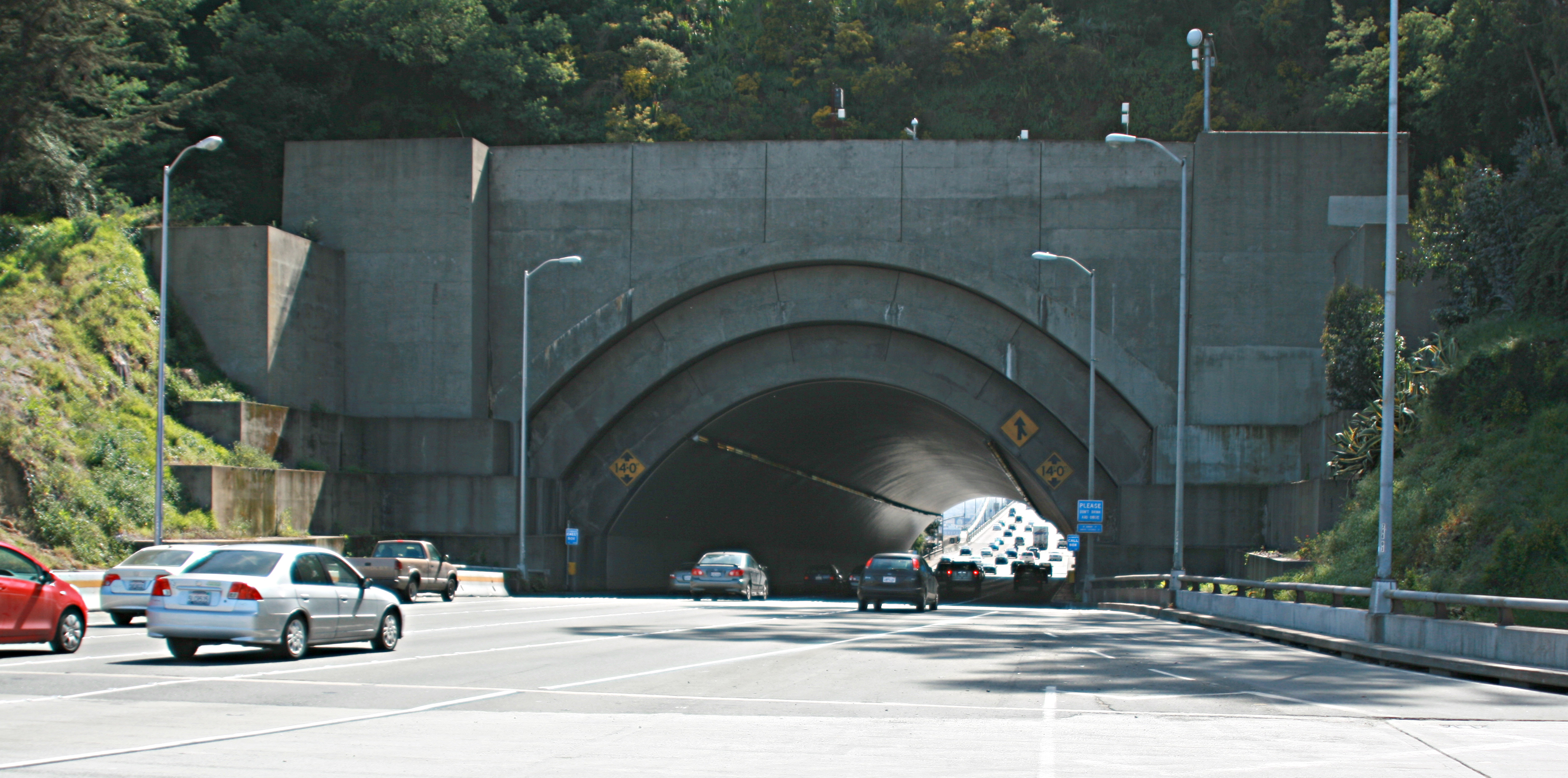
Viewed from a completed portion of the YBITS, this double-deck tunnel connects the eastern and western spans.

The following sequence is applied to each span between columns:

1. Since the wooden or metal form that supported the casting of the concrete was elevated, the forms were supported on falsework, in this case using vertical pipe sections, steel beams, and diagonal cables. A wooden deck was then erected atop the falsework to support the lowest forming surface.
2. Reinforcing for the lowest surface of the box structure was then added, and the concrete was poured.
3. During the initial pour, reinforcing and formwork for interior shear beams and any included tendon conduits were added. Later, another concrete pour was performed.
4. Then interior formwork to support the upper (deck) surface was added and the rebar-pour process was repeated.
5. After the concrete is sufficiently cured and any tendons were tensioned, the formwork and falsework was removed, leaving only the concrete surfaces.

=== Island ramps ===
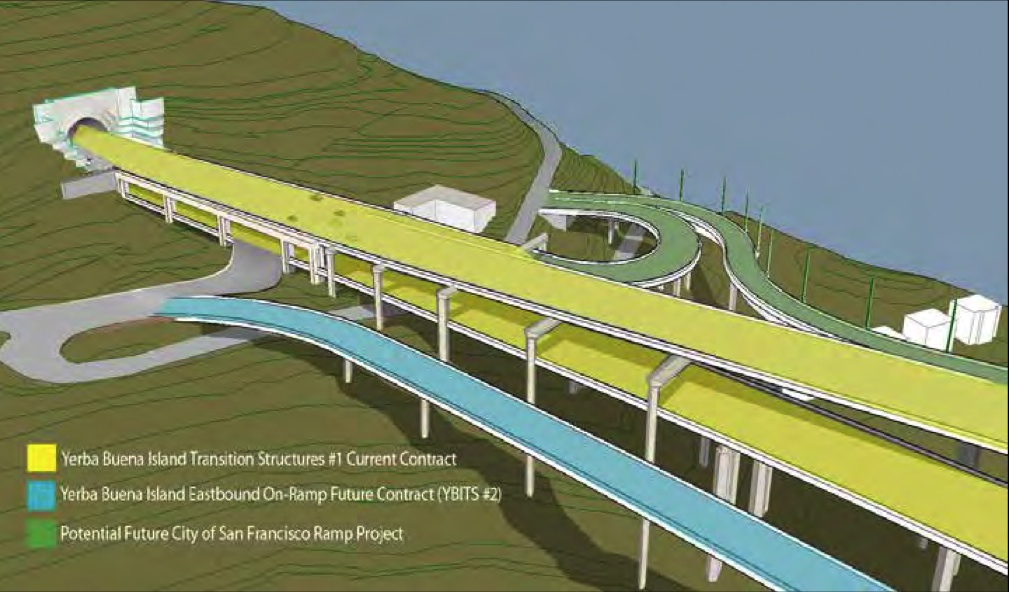
Yerba Buena Island ramps Caltrans eastbound on-ramp City of San Francisco Yerba Buena Island westbound on-off ramps

Other than the current westbound off ramp, existing ramps linking the bridge traffic to Yerba Buena Island and Treasure Island are inadequate to handle traffic for future expected residential development. In particular, the eastbound off ramp has always been extremely hazardous, while added westbound on ramp traffic would interfere with bridge traffic flow. Between the tunnel's western portal and the existing western suspension span, there is no room for modern ramp configurations. The developments are expected to add some 3,000 residents to the island, as well as business and office space. To support this traffic, a system of new ramps (currently only partially completed) will be built on the eastern side of the islands to link to the YBITS, where there will be adequate room for proper traffic merges and departures. The east-side ramps are expected to cost about $95.67 million while they began construction on late-2013 for a June 2016 opening. New westbound on- and off-ramps opened on October 22, 2016.

=== Lighting ===
The skyway and YBITS structures have custom lighting using 48,000 high-performance LEDs grouped in 1521 fixtures, most of which are mounted on 273 poles. These fixtures were designed by Moffatt & Nichol and built by Valmont Industries. Within a specific fixture the beam pattern of each LED is restricted by a masking structure. Each fixture has been adjusted independently and with the LED masking will illuminate the roadways only in the direction of travel, similar to the vehicles' headlights and therefore greatly reducing glare presented to drivers. This is expected to improve safety for travelers. The main span roadways are illuminated by downward-pointing LED fixtures mounted upon the main cable suspender saddles. Additional upward-facing decorative lighting at the extreme outboard edges of the roadways illuminate the suspender cables and the underside of the main cable. Additional lights highlight the main tower.

Lighting images

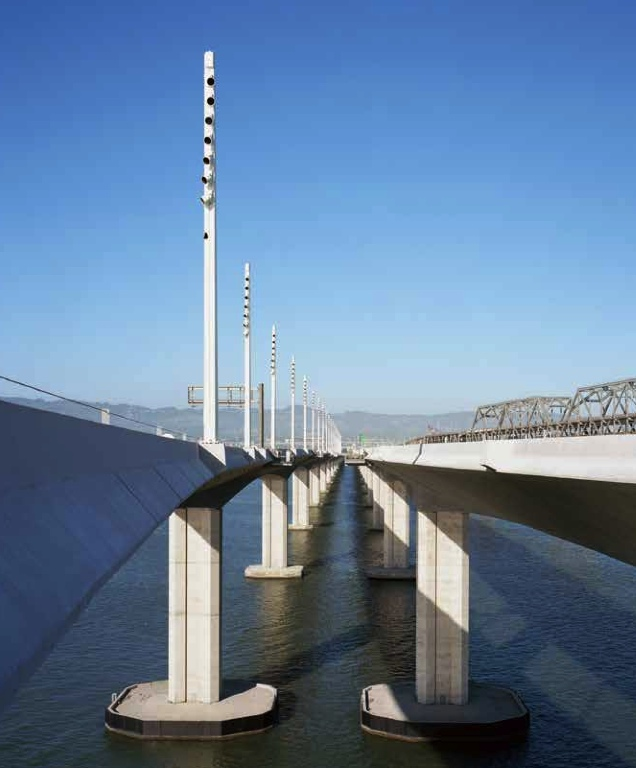
Skyway light poles and fixtures complete on left skyway, later added to right

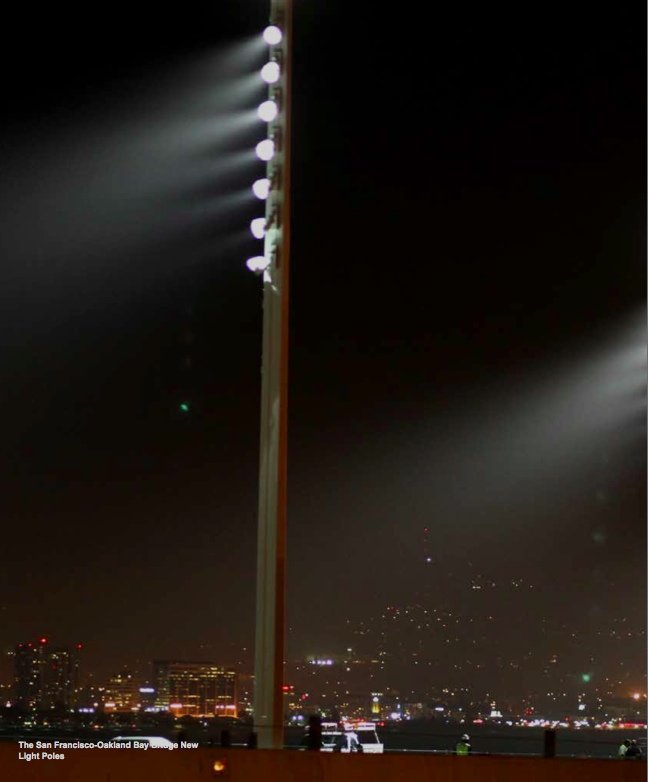
Skyway lighting undergoing test.

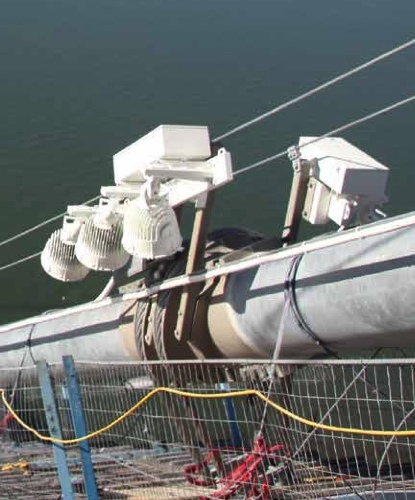
Cable-mounted fixtures

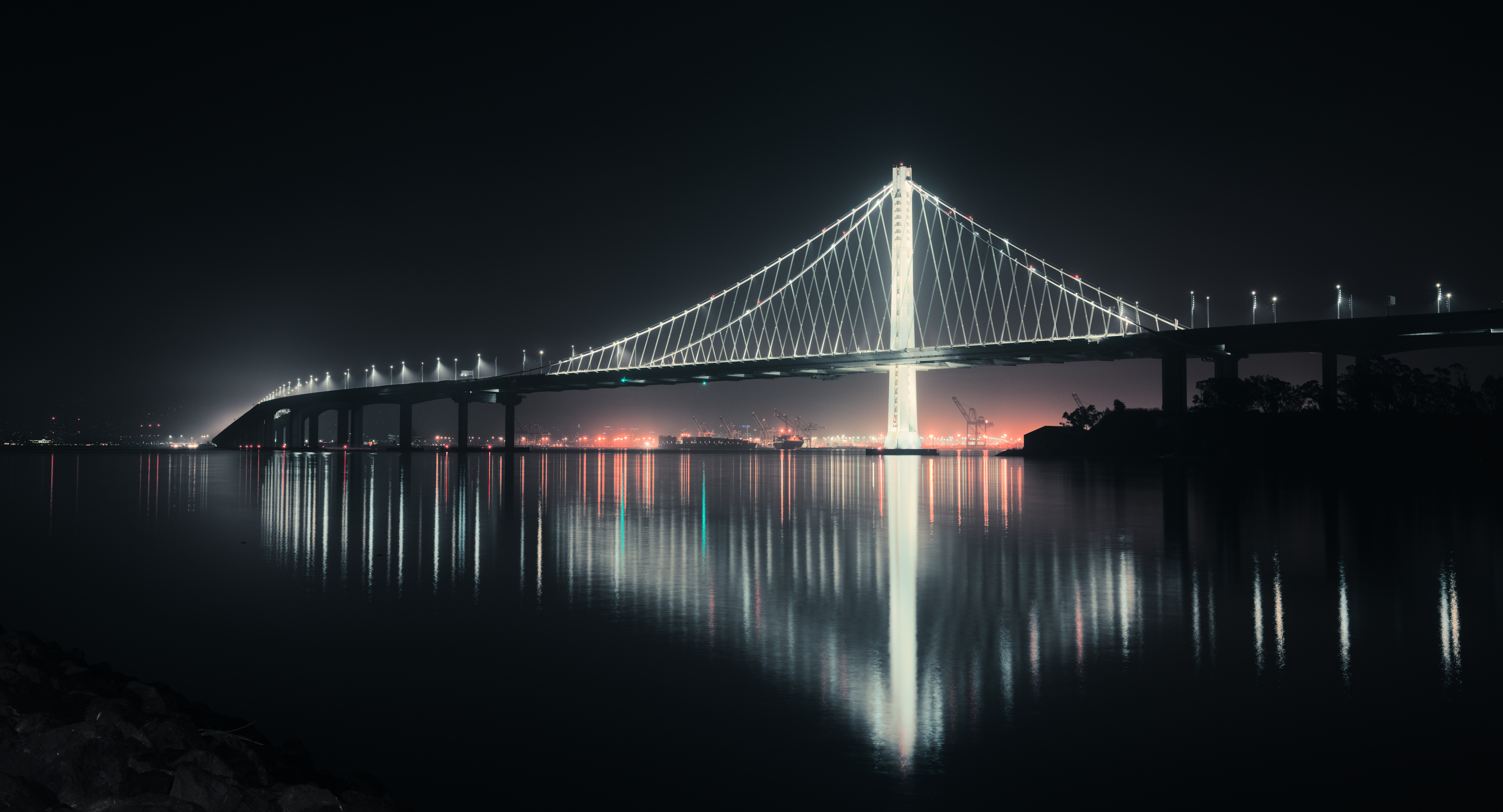
Decorative lighting effect of roadside and main-cable lamps

These lights use about half of the power of the old bridge's lights and will last about 5 to 7 times longer. They will only have to be replaced every 10 to 15 years (compared to every 2 years with the old east span), reducing cost, improving worker safety and reducing traveler inconvenience due to lane closures.

== Removal of old spans ==
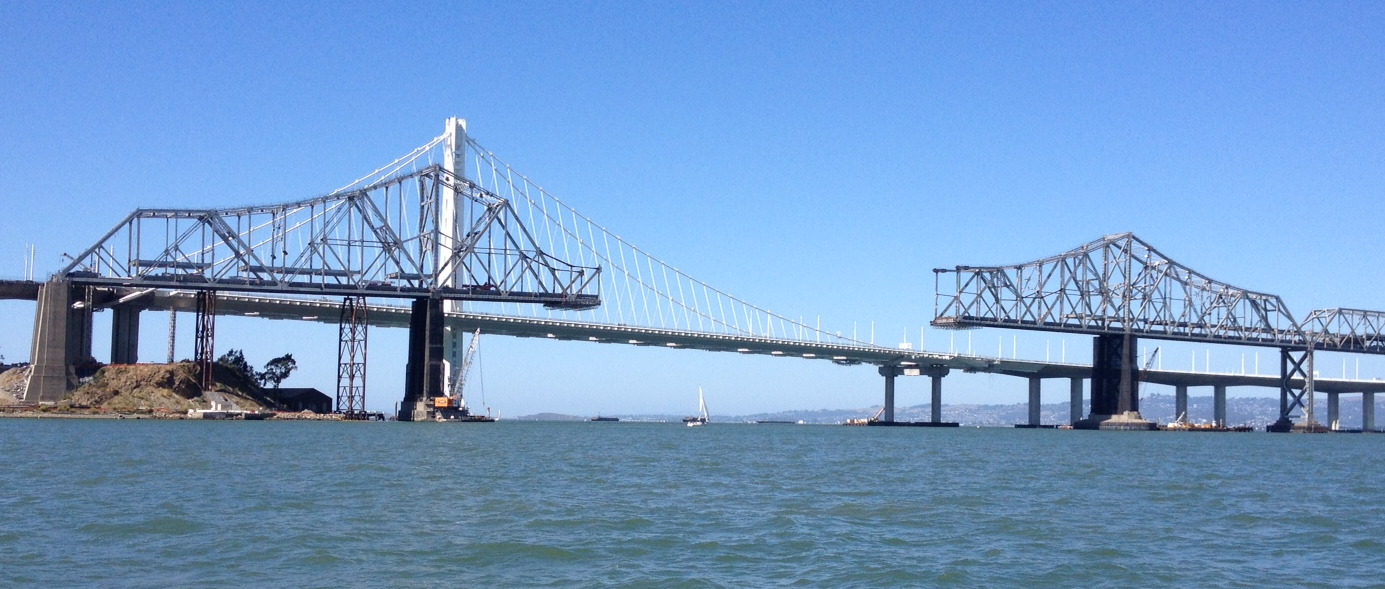
The old eastern span of the San Francisco-Oakland Bay Bridge was dismantled in the reverse order of its construction. (Image August 23, 2014.)

The first phase was to remove the double balanced cantilever span. From the several alternatives available the dismantling method was chosen over options that involved demolition by explosives. In this process the bridge was disassembled, removing individual pieces mostly in the reverse order of the original construction. This required the construction of temporary support structures such as were used in the original construction. A concurrent effort removed the temporary S-curve allowing completion of the new span's bicycle and pedestrian path and improvement of the east-bound vehicular approaches.

Dismantling was delayed by the presence of nesting cormorants. By mid-November, the main-span portion of the western (left) cantilever and its tower had been almost completely removed and temporary supports were erected beneath the right portion of the eastern cantilever. As of May 2015, only a third of the rightmost span remained and by June 12, 2015 the task was completed On November 14, 2015 the concrete cellular foundation of pier E3 (which supported the eastern cantilever tower) was explosively demolished with the debris falling into the steel caisson below the mud bay bottom. Numerous sequentially detonated charges and an all-around air bubble curtain were used to reduce underwater shock waves in order to protect marine life. For Caltrans E3 removal planning details see this link

The second phase entailed the removal of the five truss spans and the truss causeway, and the third and final phase was the removal of the underwater foundations. The entire dismantling project was completed on November 11, 2017.

As the old East Span was dismantled, materials removed from the structure were loaded onto barges and shipped away for recycling.

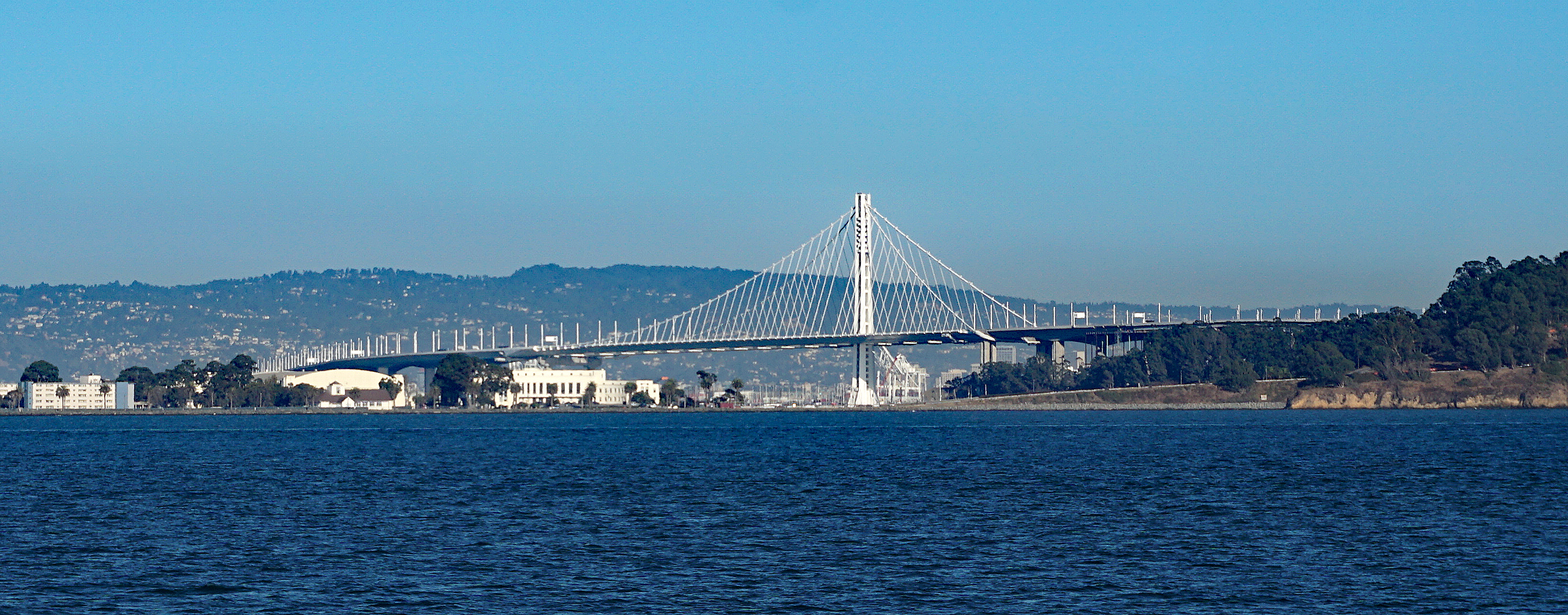
New eastern span after the old span was removed (2017)

== Judge John Sutter Regional Shoreline ==
On October 21, 2020, Judge John Sutter Regional Shoreline, located at the foot of the bridge, opened to the public. The park, which was originally proposed as "Gateway Park", features a 600-foot long observation pier made from the existing foundations of the old bridge, and allows for easier access to the bay and the Alexander Zuckerman Bike Path.

== Pedestrian walkway ==
The span includes a pedestrian and bicycle route, formally named the Alexander Zuckermann Bike Path. The path is named in memory of Alexander Zuckermann, the founder of the East Bay Bicycle Coalition and an advocate of the Bay Bridge Trail. The pedestrian and bicycle route connects the East Bay to Yerba Buena Island.

As of 2024, there is no bicycle or pedestrian lane on the western span of the Bay Bridge connecting Yerba Buena Island to San Francisco, but bicycles and pedestrians can instead travel by bus or ferry between the island and San Francisco. The complementary bicycle and pedestrian pathway across the western span to San Francisco is in early planning phases with no source of funding identified as of 2024, leading the Metropolitan Transit Commission to suggest that "If funding is secured, [the western span bike lane] could open as early as 2033."

== Construction incidents ==
=== Weld controversy ===
On April 6, 2005, the FBI announced an investigation into allegations by 15 former welders and inspectors on the new span that welders were rushed to an extent affecting their performance on up to one-third of the welds, and that workers were ordered to cover up the defective welds by re-welding in a superficial manner. Many of these welds were then embedded in concrete, some deep underwater.

A California Department of Transportation (Caltrans) spokesperson quickly responded with a public assertion that it was not possible that defective welds could be hidden from Caltrans inspectors. This was subsequently tested by radiological, ultrasonic and microscopic inspection of some of the welds that were accessible and alleged to be deficient. On April 21, 2005, news reports indicated that the Federal Highway Administration hired private inspectors to remove 300-pound (136 kg) sections for detailed laboratory analysis.

On May 4, 2005, the Federal Highway Administration said the tests by three independent contractors showed that welds pulled from three 500-pound (230 kg) steel chunks of the bridge "either met or exceeded required specifications." Since some of the material removed for inspection was specifically identified by the welders' complaints as worthy of inspection, this finding was received as good news.

=== Potential foundation problems ===
In early November 2011, The Sacramento Bee newspaper reported and analyzed various reports (including "whistle-blower" statements) concerning the potential for falsified inspection reports associated with deep pile foundations, including some supporting the SAS main tower. That article, and a later Sacramento Bee article published on May 26, 2012, provided details about construction and testing concerns and quoted experts in relevant engineering fields who raised questions about the adequacy of Caltrans's testing and oversight, and construction and testing practices of the bridge builder. On June 12, 2012, shortly after publicly supporting further study of the concerns raised in the May Bee article, Caltrans issued a press release with an attached letter to the Bee's Executive Editor from Caltrans Director Malcolm Dougherty. That letter included a request for a full retraction of the article, this after asserting a number of specific technical refutations and criticisms of the language and tone of the story. On June 24, 2012, Joyce Terhaar, the Executive Editor of the Bee, responded in defense of the article and the mission of the paper. Caltrans has also responded with a nearly one-hour video presentation.

On August 4, 2012, The Bee reported on a study in progress by Caltrans engineers, who are examining foundation testing for the agency. That team of engineers, called the "GamDat" team by Caltrans, found new evidence of questionable data associated with tests of the tower foundation. Following that Bee article, the California Senate Transportation Committee asked the state Legislative Analyst's Office to convene a panel of independent experts to examine concerns about the SAS tower foundation and to report on its findings. That report is expected to be released in by the Spring of 2013.

The Sacramento Bee published a further article on June 7, 2014.

=== Bolt failure ===
Three-inch-diameter (7.6 cm) bolts connect portions of the bridge deck mounting bosses to several concrete columns. There are 288 such bolts of various lengths. The bolts were tested in place by overtightening their retaining nuts. In the two weeks subsequent to this tightening, 32 of the first 96 bolts loaded failed. These bolts vary in length from 9 to 17 feet (2.7 to 5.2 m) and failure was initially attributed to hydrogen embrittlement, with hydrogen introduced during either manufacturing or electroplating. Some of the bolts can be replaced while others cannot be removed and load transfer will require more complex remediation methods. Repairs were initially not expected to delay the opening, but later it was believed it would delay the opening until December. The fix could cost up to $5 million. A temporary fix was announced on August 15, 2013, with the opening revised back to its original date. The solution selected was to add a tendon-secured saddle at each deck boss location. It was suggested internally that issues with tensioning the main cable may have led to the bolt failures.

The retrofit to repair the bolt failures was put into service on December 19, 2013. The fix ended up costing $25 million, much higher than the original estimates and cost projections.

=== Water leaks in superstructure attachments ===
Some bridge components are mounted on the upper surface of the primary structure. Many of these require sealing against water intrusion into the interior of the deck box sections. Improper application of sealants beneath barriers to contain traffic on the bridge has been found to allow water entry into the interior. Interior moisture has led to damaging corrosion, which must now be repaired.

=== Hold down rod grouting failure ===
The steel support structures are attached to concrete foundations with partially threaded steel rods in conduits. These conduits were supposed to be filled with concrete grout after installation. Some of these voids were temporarily closed at the top with a concrete seal. Later workers incorrectly interpreted some of these locations as having been grouted when they were only sealed at the very top. Incomplete grouting can lead to salt-water intrusion that will accelerate corrosion of these critical rods. It is planned to bore small holes into the grouting to determine which locations require additional grouting or an alternative, injection of oil or similar material, to displace any water.

=== Substandard component fabrication and related project management issues ===
The automated welding procedures used by the deck boxes fabricator (Shanghai Zhenhua Port Machinery Co. Ltd.) were frequently performed in the rain. Such welding has been long recognized as leading to the cracking of imperfect welds. Such welds were considered by Caltrans management to be of low criticality in this bridge owing to the compressive forces imposed on the deck structure by this particular design. There are also reports of the vendor being uncooperative to the concerns of Caltrans inspectors and engineers. Owing to the fragility of the old cantilever structure and the possibility of a destructive earthquake, Caltrans felt motivated to avoid further delays in the new span's completion.

In late January 2014, a Contra Costa Times article reported the results of a California State Senate transportation panel investigation. The panel's report was titled "The San Francisco-Oakland Bay Bridge: Basic Reforms for the Future". This preliminary report, written by a contractor to the committee, states

It is the finding of this investigation that there appears to have been chronic attempts to keep many of the serious safety allegations quiet, put aside and not dealt with in an open, businesslike manner in the public's interest .

Another California newspaper, the Sacramento Bee, reported on July 31, 2014:

A California Senate report released Thursday said that Department of Transportation managers "gagged and banished" at least nine top experts for the new $6.5 billion San Francisco-Oakland Bay Bridge after they complained about substandard work by the Shanghai, China, firm that built much of the span.

A State Senate investigation continued in August, with threats of criminal prosecution directed to Caltrans.

== See also ==
- Messina Type Deck
